= Moses (3/3) =

Public sculpture of the prophet Moses by American artist Tony Smith

Moses (Smith)
- Artist: Tony Smith
- Year: 1968 (1998)
- Dimensions: 350 cm × 220 cm × 460 cm (138 in × 88 in × 180 in)
- Location: Toledo Museum of Art; Toledo, Ohio; 41°39′31.94″N 83°33′33.49″W
- Owner: Toledo Museum of Art

Moses (3/3) is a public sculpture of the prophet Moses by United States artist Tony Smith. It is on the grounds of the Toledo Museum of Art in Toledo, Ohio. The title of the work was inspired from readings of his own work that links this sculpture to the work of Michelangelo and Rembrandt.

== Description ==
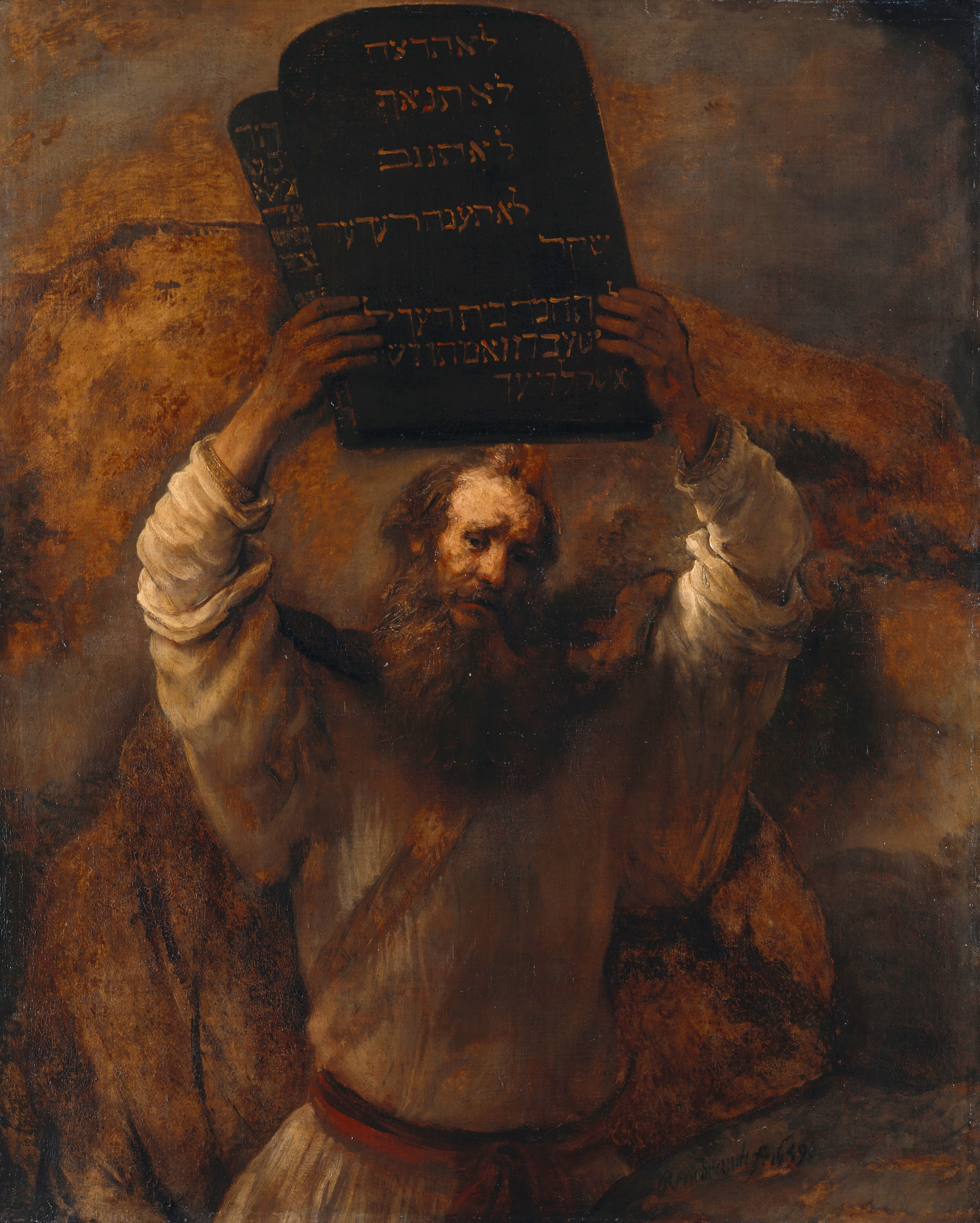
Moses Showing the Tablets of the Law to the People (1659) by Rembrandt.

Moses is a black, painted steel sculpture that stands 11'6" (h) x 15' (w) x 7'4" (d). Like many of Tony Smith's large sculptures, Moses was developed with geometric and mathematical principles in mind. It is a monumental sculpture with tilting faces and extending branches. In fact, the sculpture appears different when viewed from every vantage point. Similar to other sculptures by Smith, Moses mixes anthropomorphism (human scale and characteristics) with geometry. Smith named the sculpture for the Hebrew prophet Moses, as depicted in the painting by Rembrandt. The two vertical arms of the sculpture evoke the religious scene of Moses holding the tablet of the Ten Commandments in his outstretched arms.

== Historical information ==
Moses was conceptually developed by Tony Smith in 1969 and was fabricated in 1998. This is the third in an edition of three, with one artist's proof. The versions of this sculpture have been fabricated; Moses (1/3) belongs to Princeton University, and Moses (2/3) belongs to the city of Seattle and is displayed at the Seattle City Center.

Moses was included in an exhibit by the Museum of Modern Art in New York as part of a show entitled "Tony Smith: Architect, Painter, Sculptor."

=== Acquisition ===
Moses was accessioned by the Toledo Museum of Art in 2009. It was a gift of Marshall Fields, by exchange. It is currently on display in the Georgia and David K. Welles Sculpture Garden.

== See also ==
- Moses 1968, about all three statues
- List of sculptures by Tony Smith
