= Trap (3/9) =

- Artist: Tony Smith
- Year: 1968
- Type: Bronze, black patina
- Dimensions: 65 cm × 355 cm × 355 cm (25.4 in × 139.7 in × 139.7 in)
- Location: Private Collection, Birmingham, Alabama

Trap is a sculpture by American artist Tony Smith which was made in an edition of nine with one artist's proof. This bronze sculpture was designed to be large-scale, but was only realized in bronze of the smaller size in 1968. The bronze was patinated to appear black.

== Description ==
Trap is based on a rhomboid motif that is illustrative of Smith’s familiarity with and novel employment of classical mathematical and geometric structures. It is also reminiscent of the Greek key motif found on decorations on ancient Greek temples to Greek restaurant paper coffee cups. The sculpture is designed to invite the visitor enter the space and become “trapped” in its mini-maze.

== See also ==
- List of Tony Smith sculptures
- The Tony Smith Artist Research Project in Wikipedia
