= Moses (1968) =

Series of three painted steel statues

Moses is a series of three different painted steel statues of geometric shapes, created by Tony Smith.

Moses 1/3 is in the John B. Putnam, Jr. Memorial Collection of Sculpture at Princeton University, Moses 2/3 is in the collection of the Seattle Arts Commission; and Moses 3/3 at the Toledo Museum of Art as a gift of Marshall Field's, by exchange.

== Description ==
Moses is constructed from various, interlocking geometric forms. The sculpture is fundamentally abstract, and it changes substantially as a viewer walks around it—there is no clear "front" or "back". The work's title does evoke a certain anthropomorphism, however. Smith often titled his sculptures based on the images they triggered in his imagination. This sculpture's forms summoned for him an image of the Hebrew prophet Moses holding the tablets of the Ten Commandments in upraised arms.

Moses was singled out for mention in a review of the Museum of Modern Art's 1998 Tony Smith retrospective, for which the Toledo Museum of Art lent its edition of the sculpture. Mark Stevens wrote: "In a massive black sculpture such as Moses, you can sense the geometric backbone of nature as well as the girders of the modern city; the sculpture is a bold statement full of whispering angles."

According to a 1985 gallery catalogue, Smith created Moses in a significantly smaller version (22.5 x 28 x 16 in.) in a bronze edition of nine, and in two other steel editions of three, also in distinct sizes (34 x 44 x 24 in. and 552 x 720 x 352 in.), though not every size may have been fabricated.

== See also ==
- List of sculptures by Tony Smith
