= Cigarette (1/3) =

Public artwork by Tony Smith

- Artist: Tony Smith
- Year: 1961
- Location: 42°55′54″N 78°52′35″W

Cigarette is a public artwork by the American artist Tony Smith, located on the grounds of the Albright Knox Art Gallery in Buffalo, New York. The work is a minimalist piece of environmental sculpture created in 1961. The sculpture is over 15 feet (4.6 m) tall and made of flat planes of steel in a twisted form. This is the first in an edition of three (with one artists proof); another is at MoMA in New York City.

A small scale version of the work is in the collection of the Saint Louis Art Museum.

== See also ==
- List of Tony Smith sculptures
- The Tony Smith Artist Research Project in Wikipedia
