= Smog (1/3) =

Public artwork by Tony Smith

Coordinates: 44°0′46.42″N 73°10′50.34″W

- Artist: Tony Smith
- Year: 1969–1970, fabricated 2000
- Type: Aluminum, painted black
- Dimensions: 210 cm × 2,400 cm × 1,800 cm (84 in × 960 in × 720 in)
- Location: Middlebury College Museum of Art; Middlebury, VT
- Owner: Middlebury College

Smog is a public artwork by American artist Tony Smith located to the south east of McCardell Bicentennial Hall on the Middlebury College campus, in Middlebury, Vermont. An example of minimalist sculpture, the piece is a lattice of 45 octahedra, standing on 22 tetrahedra, and topped with 15 prisms. It is fabricated from aluminum, painted black. This work is first in an edition of three, with one artist's proof.

Lippincotts, LLC was commissioned by the estate of the artist to manage the construction of this artwork, and the piece was fabricated by WeldingWorks, Inc. of Madison, Connecticut in 2000.

== Historical information ==
Smith derived Smog from Smoke, a vertically oriented work first produced in painted plywood and installed at the Corcoran Gallery of Art in 1967. After this version had been deinstalled and modified and returned to the artist, Smith re-worked the forms into a horizontally oriented work which he called Smog. The sculpture has been produced on a smaller scale, measuring 12 inches x 113 inches x 79 inches, in cast bronze with a black patina.

== Acquisition ==
The sculpture was purchased by Middlebury College's Committee on Art in Public Places with funds provided by the Middlebury College College Board of Trustees One Percent for Art Policy on the occasion of the construction of the Bicentennial Hall. The policy sets aside one percent of the cost of any renovation or new construction at the College for the purchase, installation, maintenance, and interpretation of works of art publicly displayed on campus.

In conjunction with the sculpture's dedication on October 21, 2000, the Middlebury College Museum of Art mounted an exhibition, Tony Smith's Smog: A New Sculpture for Middlebury which featured models, preparatory drawings, and photographs related to the history of the sculpture.

== See also ==
- List of Tony Smith sculptures
