= Moondog (3/3) =

Sculpture by Tony Smith

- Artist: Tony Smith
- Year: 1964
- Type: Aluminum, painted black
- Dimensions: 521.3 cm × 468.0 cm × 467.4 cm (17 ft 1 1/4 in × 15 ft 4 1/4 in × 15 ft 4 in)
- Location: National Gallery of Art, Washington, D.C.
- 38.89090700°N 77.02270600°W
- Owner: National Gallery of Art

Moondog is a minimalist sculpture created by Tony Smith in 1964. The piece is composed of 15 octahedra and 10 tetrahedra, and while perfectly ordered and symmetrical when seen from certain angles, it carries a strong tilt forward when seen from other angles. This is the third of an edition of three in the series (with one artist's proof).

The title refers to Joan Miró's painting Dog Barking at the Moon and a blind poet and composer named Moondog.

It was installed at the Museum of Modern Art. In 1997, it showed at Paula Cooper Gallery. The work currently resides in the National Gallery of Art Sculpture Garden.

== See also ==
- List of public art in Washington, D.C., Ward 2
- List of Tony Smith sculptures
- The Tony Smith Artist Research Project in Wikipedia
