= Tau (sculpture) =

Sculpture by Tony Smith

Tau, by American sculptor Tony Smith, was designed in the early 1960s. It is 14’ high x 12’ wide x 12’ deep, and made from black painted steel. Its title refers to the Greek letter Τ (tau), which also describes the shape of the sculpture. Fascinated by mathematics, biology and crystals, Smith designed Tau with geometry at its root. There are two extant versions of the large sculpture: Tau (AP), and Tau (1/3).

== Description ==
Many of Smith's sculptures were made up of a space lattice: groupings of simple platonic solids, in Tau's case two such solids, octahedrons and tetrahedrons. The original model for the sculpture was created by Smith in 1961–62 using his signature process of joining small cardboard tetrahedrons, a process he began while recuperating after a severe automobile accident in the spring of 1961.

During this period, Smith was transitioning from his 20-year career in architecture to focus on painting and making sculptures. Smith had also started teaching at Hunter College, New York, in 1962. It took over 20 years for the piece to be installed outside the upper east side college at the 6 train's 68th Street entrance in 1984. In 2004, Hunter College held an exhibition, "Tracing Tau", curated by William C. Agee that offered an insight into the sculpture and its beginnings through paper models, drawings and plans of the work.

== Historical information ==
Tau forms part of Smith's series of cast bronze and painted steel sculptures including Amaryllis (1965) and The Snake Is Out (1962), all evolution of his first titled sculpture, Throne (1956–57). Though Tau is one of Smith's less publicized works, it is part of a body of work inspired by his oft-cited, revelatory road trip to the unfinished New Jersey Turnpike in the early 1950s.

When I was teaching at Cooper Union in the first year or two of the '50s, someone told me how I could get on to the unfinished New Jersey Turnpike. I took three students and drove from somewhere in the Meadows to New Brunswick. It was a dark night and there were no lights or shoulder markers, lines, railings or anything at all except the dark pavement moving through the landscape of the flats, rimmed by hills in the distance, but punctuated by stacks, towers, fumes and colored lights. This drive was a revealing experience. The road and much of the landscape was artificial, and yet it couldn't be called a work of art. On the other hand, it did something for me that art had never done. At first I didn't know what it was, but its effect was to liberate me from many of the views I had had about art. It seemed that there had been a reality there which had not had any expression in art.

The experience on the road was something mapped out but not socially recognized. I thought to myself, it ought to be clear that's the end of art. Most paintings look pretty pictorial after that. There is no way you can frame it, you just have to experience it. Later I discovered some abandoned airstrips in Europe -- abandoned works, Surrealist landscapes, something that had nothing to do with any function, created worlds without tradition. Artificial landscape without cultural precedent began to dawn on me. This is a drill ground in Nuremberg, large enough to accommodate two million men. The entire field is enclosed with high embankments and towers. The concrete approach is three 16-inch steps, one above the other, stretching for a mile or so."

== Tau (AP) ==
Tau (AP) is located in Smith’s hometown of South Orange, New Jersey. This version of the sculpture was fabricated at the Lippincott Foundry in 2005.

Tau, AP
- Year: designed 1961–62, fabricated 2005
- Dimensions: 430 cm × 370 cm × 370 cm (168 in × 144 in × 144 in)
- Location: South Orange, New Jersey

The Lennie Pierro Memorial Arts Foundation, based in South Orange, launched the effort to fabricate and install Tau in 2002. Jane Smith (a.k.a. Jane Lawrence), the artist’s widow, donated the rights to fabricate the sculpture. Working in partnership with the local Board of Trustees, the Foundation hired landscape architect Ann Kearsley to develop a plan for situating and installing the sculpture in town. Kearsley’s 2003 proposal depicted the sculpture in the heart of the town’s commercial district, near the train station and the performing arts center, which was also in development at the time.

The public-private partnership between the Tony Smith Sculpture Project and the township of South Orange turned sour in 2006 when some area residents raised concerns about allocating public funds to support fabricating, installing, and maintaining the sculpture. They argued that tax dollars would be better spent on other projects. Debates about using public funds for art are common throughout US history.

As a result of heated local controversy over funding for Tau, the Tony Smith Sculpture Project ended its partnership with the township of South Orange. Working in collaboration with the Pierro Foundation, the Tony Smith Sculpture Project hosted benefit events and other fundraisers to cover the cost of fabrication, and they identified a new site for the sculpture – one that would be less expensive to ready for installation. Kearsley drafted a new plan for installing the sculpture in Meadowland Park, in a field near a pond, and within walking distance of the town’s commercial district.

In November 2008, Tau was installed at Meadowland Park. On April 18, 2009, supporters of the Tony Smith Sculpture project gathered to dedicate the sculpture. Smith’s daughters, Kiki Smith and Seton Smith, as well as renowned curator Robert Storr, also attended the event.

== Tau (1/3) ==
Tau (1/3)
- Year: 1961
- Dimensions: 430 cm × 640 cm × 370 cm (168 in × 252 in × 144 in)
- Location: New York City; 40°46′4.18″N 73°57′51.96″W
- Owner: Hunter College

Tau (1/3) is located on the urban campus of Hunter College, in New York City, New York, United States of America.

== See also ==
- List of sculptures by Tony Smith
- The Tony Smith Artist Research Project in Wikipedia
