= She Who Must Be Obeyed (sculpture) =

Artwork by Tony Smith

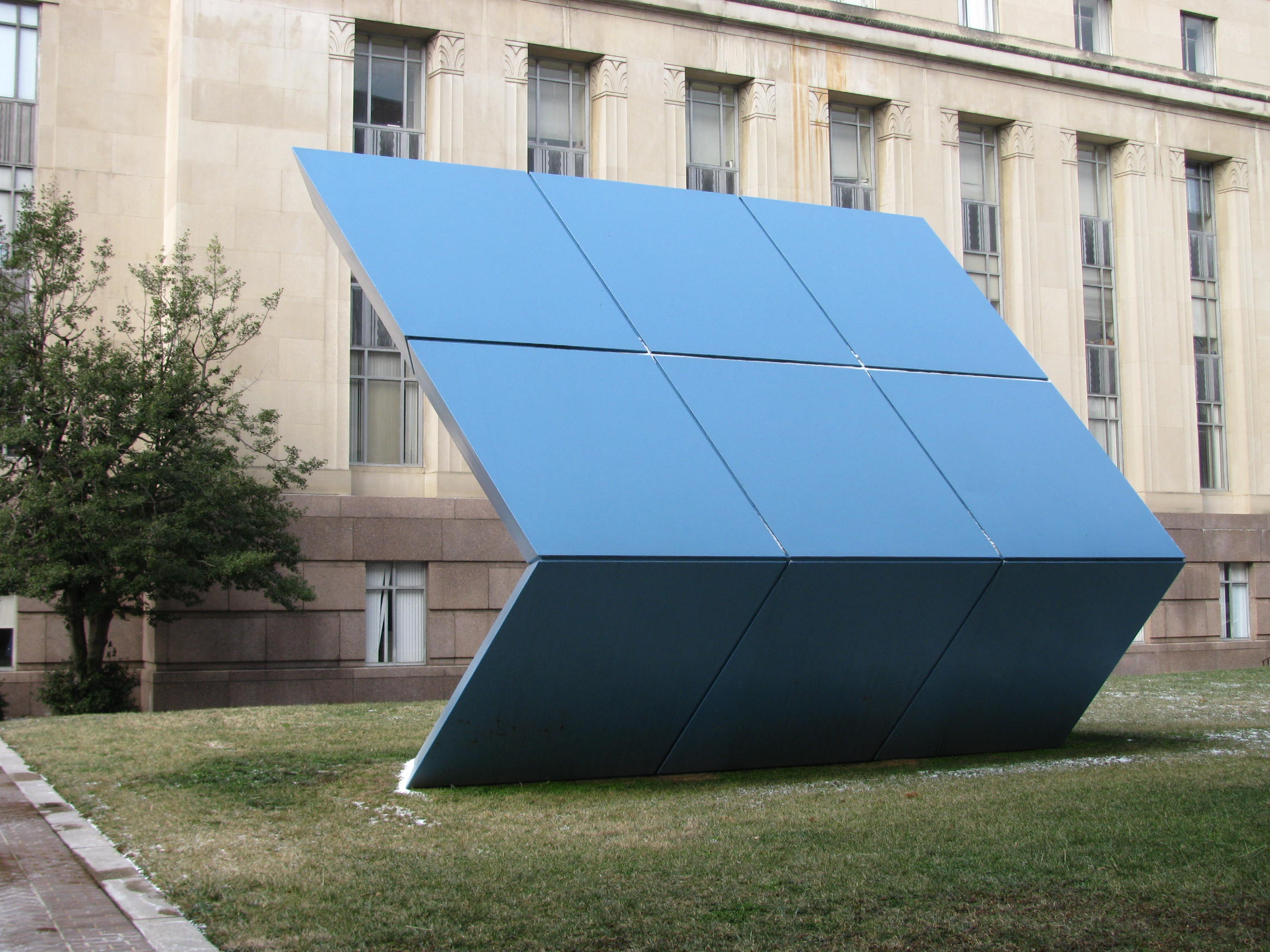
- Artist: Tony Smith
- Year: 1975
- Type: Steel, painted blue
- Dimensions: 9.1 m × 2.4 m × 7.3 m (30 ft × 8 ft × 24 ft)
- Location: Washington, D.C.; 38.8946°N 77.0157°W
- Owner: General Services Administration

She Who Must Be Obeyed is a minimalist sculpture 33 feet (10 m) wide and 16 feet (4.9 m) deep made by Tony Smith in 1975. It is located at the Frances Perkins Building, in downtown Washington, D.C. The piece consists of nine geometric rhomboid units, bolted and welded together and painted blue.

Tony Smith's career encompassed architecture, painting, and sculpture. The General Services Administration commissioned the 21 foot (6.4 m) high steel construction that is painted blue in 1974 for its Art in Public Places program. Smith said that he was willing to forgo the standard honorarium for the sculpture. "I felt very honored to do something in the national capital...As far as I was concerned, I would be perfectly willing to supply it at cost….it's right near the Capitol, and it's a very nice place to be." The $98,000 fee he was awarded was consumed by the production of the imposing work.

== Description ==
During the spring of 1976 She Who Must Be Obeyed was installed on the east plaza of the newly constructed Department of Labor building—subsequently named the Frances Perkins Building—in Washington, D.C., not far from the east wing of the National Gallery of Art.

Using the jargon of a master builder, which he had been, Smith explained that his sculpture "is the cross-section of a space frame made up of tetrahedral and octahedral. It's called simply a rhombus."

For various reasons, She did not become well known. One possible reason is that, until 2009, it was not easy to see She. The work was placed in an outdoor corner of the Frances Perkins Building near Second Street NW, set back—and difficult to see—from the street. Access to the work was made easier after it was restored in 2008–2009, and reinstalled on the other side of the Perkins Building, on a grassy plaza close to the intersection of Third and C Streets NW.

The construction is also an anomaly in the artist's career: instead of being painted black like most of Smith's other works, or even yellow, like a select few, it is bright blue. Initially, the artist had wanted She to be the color of pool cue chalk. In comparison to the artworks published in the pages of the Museum of Modern Art catalogue that accompanied the retrospective curated by Robert Storr in 1998, it is reproduced in black and white, not color.

Because Tony Smith's early structures, works like Die and The Elevens Are Up, were monochromatic, smooth-surfaced, and straight-edged, the older artist was referred to, during this phase of his career, as a minimalist. His closest friends and colleagues, however, included abstract expressionists Jackson Pollock and Barnett Newman. His work straddles both genres.

== Title ==
Smith had an open-ended approach to titling his works. Some shapes reminded him of specific objects; others carry the names and initials of dear friends. With its horn-like appendages, Moses refers to Michelangelo's portrayal of that patriarch. Because he was well read, and even had run a secondhand bookstore during the Great Depression, a number of the artist's sculptures have literary monikers. Gracehoper, for example, is a word that appears in Finnegans Wake, James Joyce's Modernist classic. She Who Must Be Obeyed derives from a more populist source, the 1886–87 novel She: A History of Adventure by H. Rider Haggard, a tale of a lost kingdom.

== See also ==
- List of public art in Washington, D.C., Ward 6
- List of Tony Smith sculptures
