= Source (1/3) =

- Artist: Tony Smith
- Year: 1967
- Type: painted steel
- Dimensions: 335.20 cm × 899.10 cm × 1036.30 cm (132 1/16 in × 354 3/16 in × 408 1/4 in)
- Weight: 13,400 lbs
- Location: Cleveland Museum of Art; Cleveland; 41°30′35.05″N 81°36′39.62″W
- Owner: Cleveland Museum of Art

Source is a public artwork by US artist Tony Smith, located in the Cleveland Museum of Art Donna and Stewart Kohl Sculpture Garden, which is in Cleveland, Ohio, United States. The sculpture is fabricated from steel and painted black. It is constructed from two separate pieces that are bolted together.

== Description ==
According to Smith, the title was inspired by Gustave Courbet's painting The Source at the Loue (1864).

This is the first of an edition of three. The second work is owned by the Tony Smith Estate. The third edition has not been fabricated. The sculpture is fabricated out of welded sheets of steel that are painted black in a manner that is similar to Smith's other work.

== Historical information ==
When making models for his sculptures, Smith first created modular pieces based on tetrahedrons and octahedrons. He then assembled the pieces, re-using spare parts for other models and often dismantling old models to create new structures. After dismantling the model for his 1962 sculpture Gracehoper (2/3), Smith created Source (1967) and Moses (1/3) (1968).

=== Location history ===
The location history is not available prior to acquisition by the Cleveland Museum of Art. At least from 2003, Source has been on view near the Northeast corner of the building. Starting in 2010 the artwork has been installed on the east lawn of the Cleveland Museum of Art in the Donna and Stewart Kohl Sculpture Garden.

=== Acquisition ===
This sculpture was acquired by the Cleveland Museum of Art in 2001 as a gift from the Metropolitan Bank & Trust Company.

== Condition ==
This artwork was not assessed in the SOS! survey in 1992–94. The artwork was treated in 2010. The treatment involved cleaning, removing corrosion from the surface, evening out the surface, and repainting. The conservation treatment and movement of the artwork from Wade Oval to the East Lawn was overseen by conservator Shelley Paine and featured on the museum's website in a YouTube video.

== See also ==
- List of Tony Smith sculptures
