= Wandering Rocks (disambiguation) =

The Wandering Rocks (Planctae) in Greek mythology were a group of moving rocks between which the sea was unusually violent.

Wandering Rocks may also refer to:

- "Wandering Rocks" (Ulysses episode) an episode in James Joyce's novel Ulysses
- Sailing stones, where rocks move and inscribe long tracks along a smooth valley floor without human or animal intervention
- Sculptures by American artist Tony Smith:
  - Wandering Rocks (2/5), Lynden Sculpture Garden near Milwaukee, Wisconsin
  - Wandering Rocks (4/5), Lynden Sculpture Garden near Milwaukee, Wisconsin
  - Wandering Rocks (AP), Olympic Sculpture Park in Seattle, Washington
- Wandering Rocks, a 2014 François Sarhan composition
