= Wandering Rocks (sculpture) =

Sculpture by Tony Smith

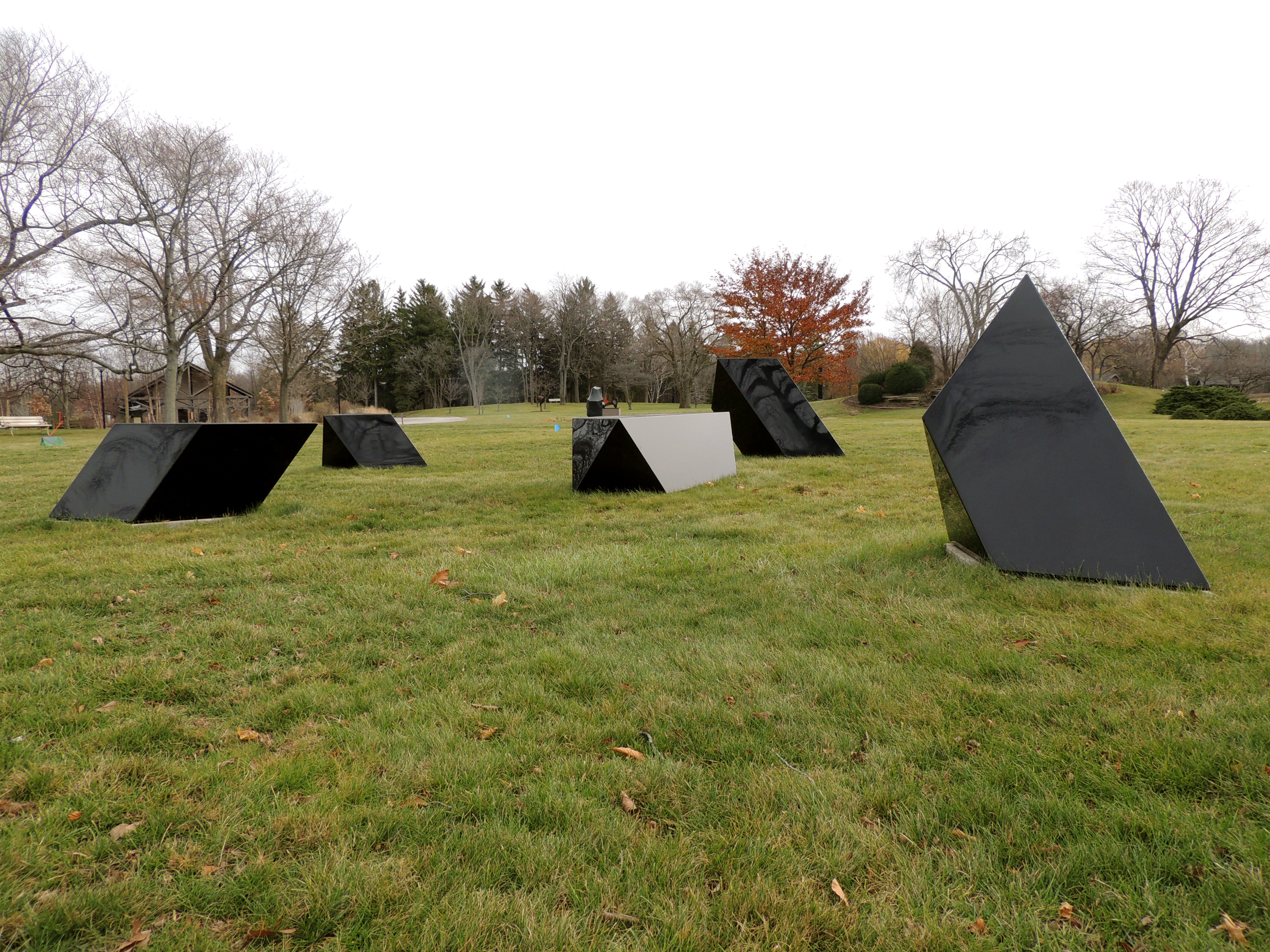
- Edition 2/5 in Milwaukee in 2012
- Artist: Tony Smith
- Year: 1967
- Movement: Minimalism

Wandering Rocks is a 1967 steel sculpture by Tony Smith, made in an edition of five plus one artist's proof. The Minimalist work comprises five different polyhedral elements painted black.

== Description ==
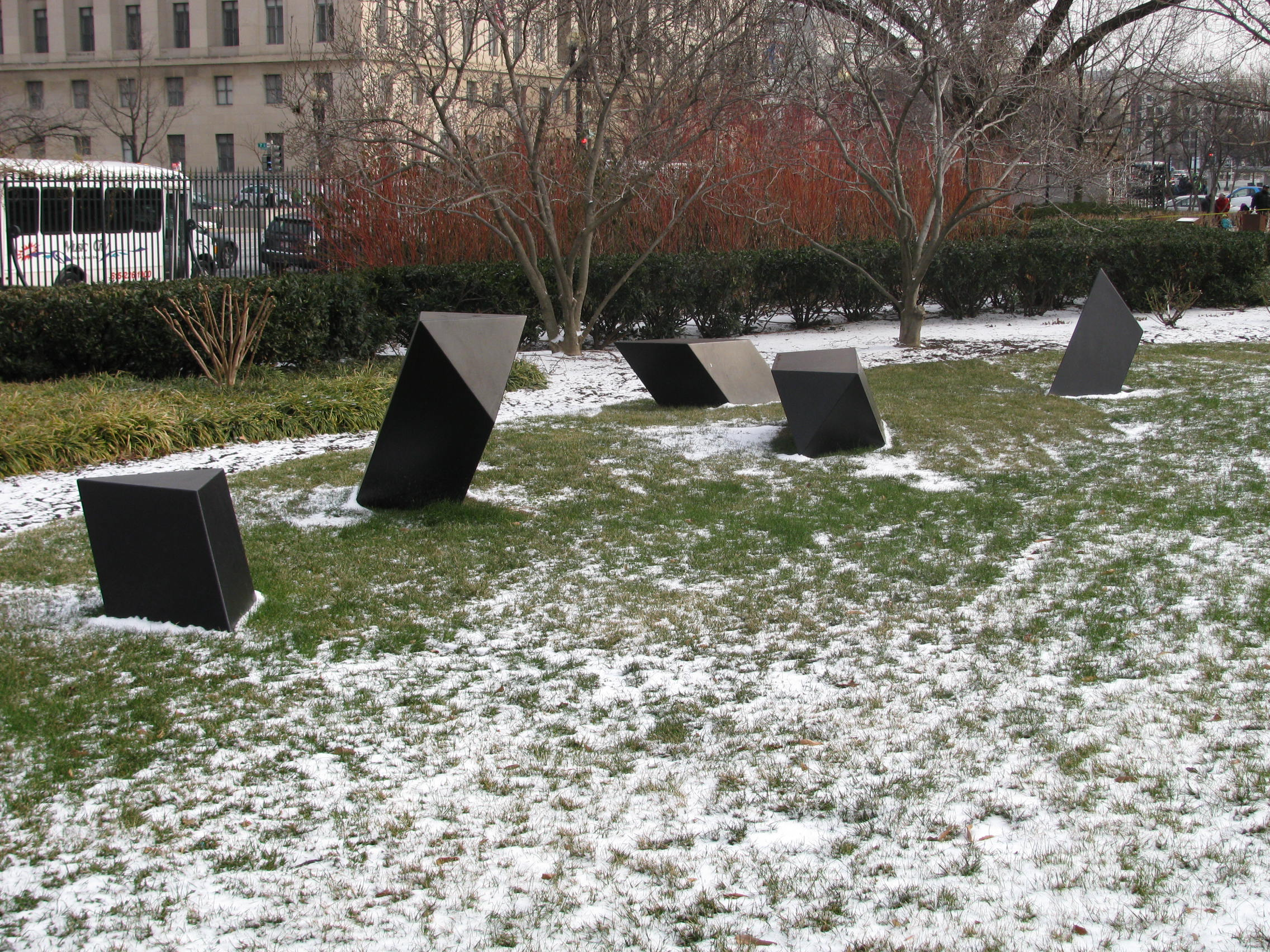
Edition 4/5 in Washington DC in 2013

The five elements of the sculpture have different size and shapes, based on tetrahedrons and octahedrons, with faceted surfaces painted with a semi-gloss black, and are individually named "Crocus", "Dud", "Shaft", "Slide", and "Smohawk". They measure from 23 in (58 cm) to 45.5 in (116 cm) in height and weigh from 361 lb (164 kg) to 742 lb (337 kg). Several of the editions are exhibited in public, typically installed outdoors on a grassed area. The elements have no fixed positions, and their relative positions and orientations may vary according to the requirements of the specific location, so each installation is different.

The work was first created as a full-size plywood mock-up and then replicated in painted metal. The sculpture may allude to the structure of molecules and crystals, or the Japanese rock garden of Ryōan-ji in Kyoto. As Smith described it: "The Rocks were really conceived as one piece, although I didn't think of them as having a fixed spatial relationship to one another. They did, however, have a temporal sequence. I thought of each piece as having an identity but also as a constituting part of a group. In this group, positions were thought of as changing."

=== Editions ===
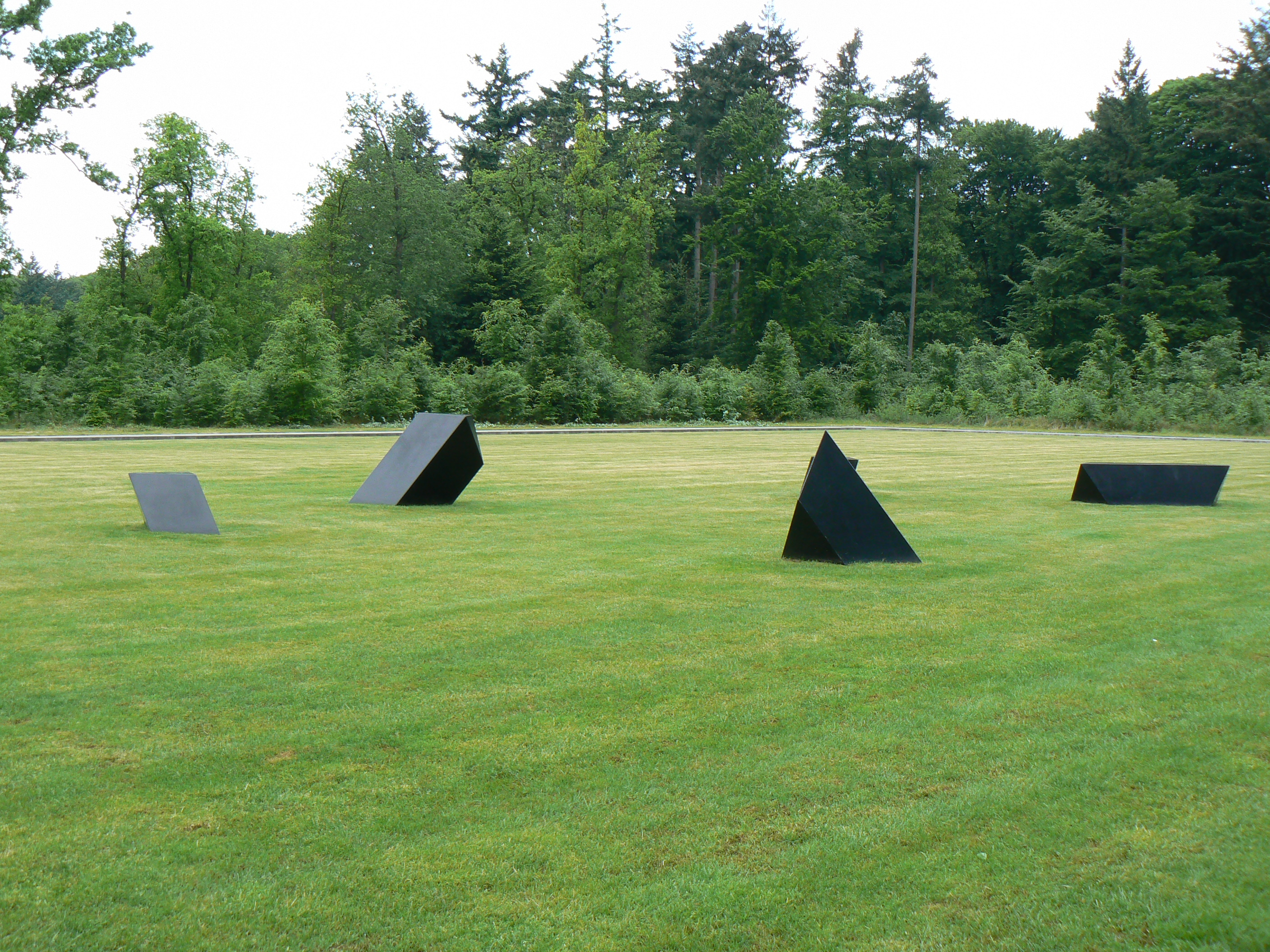
Edition 5/5 in the Netherlands in 2008

The work was created in an edition of five, plus one artist's proof:

- Wandering Rocks (AP) has been displayed in Seattle, Washington, since 2007, and is now at the Olympic Sculpture Park, donated to the Seattle Art Museum by the Virginia and Bagley Wright Collection in 2016 for the museum's 75th anniversary
- Wandering Rocks (1/5) is at Kykuit - the John D. Rockefeller Estate - in Pocantico Hills, New York
- Wandering Rocks (2/5) is at Lynden Sculpture Garden, in Milwaukee, Wisconsin, donated by the Bradley Family Foundation in 2012
- Wandering Rocks (3/5) is in a private collection, in Cleveland, Ohio
- Wandering Rocks (4/5) is at the National Gallery of Art Sculpture Garden, Washington, D.C., having been bought by the National Gallery of Art in 1981
- Wandering Rocks (5/5) is at the Kröller-Müller Museum, at Otterlo, in the Netherlands.

== See also ==
- 1967 in art
- List of Tony Smith sculptures
