= Smoke (1/3) =

Sculpture by Tony Smith at the Los Angeles County Museum of Art

- Artist: Tony Smith
- Year: 1967, fabricated 2005
- Type: Painted aluminum
- Dimensions: 740 cm × 1,430 cm × 1,010 cm (290 in × 564 in × 396 in)
- Location: Los Angeles County Museum of Art; Los Angeles, California
- Owner: Los Angeles County Museum of Art

Smoke is a large-scale sculpture conceived by American artist Tony Smith in 1967 that was fabricated posthumously in 2005 for the Los Angeles County Museum of Art (LACMA) where it was installed in 2008. This two-tier sculptures standing 24 foot tall is made of aluminum and painted black.

== Location history ==
Smoke is unique in that it is Smith’s only large-scale work specifically intended for an interior space. The first iteration of the sculpture was a painted plywood version installed in the atrium of the Corcoran Gallery in Washington D.C. in 1967. This version, measuring 45 feet long, 33 feet wide, and 22 feet high, was based on Smith's small-scale cardboard model, and was built and painted by three to seven workmen over the course of two months, at a cost of $6,000. LACMA’s painted aluminum version was installed in 2008 and the first in an edition of three; second in the edition is in a private collection.

Art historian Joan Pachner described the artwork as one that does not have a single focal point or axis: "it looks like a complicated jungle gym. Interior views are dominated by the linear scaffold and the implied infinite expanse of the design."

The sculpture has been on permanent view in the Ahmanson Building Room at LACMA since 2008.

== Acquisition ==
Smoke was acquired by LACMA in 2010 (as accession number M.2010.49) through a gift from the Belldegrun Family in honor of Rebecka Belldegrun's birthday

== See also ==
- List of Tony Smith sculptures
- Smog (1/3)
