= Stinger (sculpture) =

Sculpture in Seattle, Washington, U.S.

- 'One Gate'
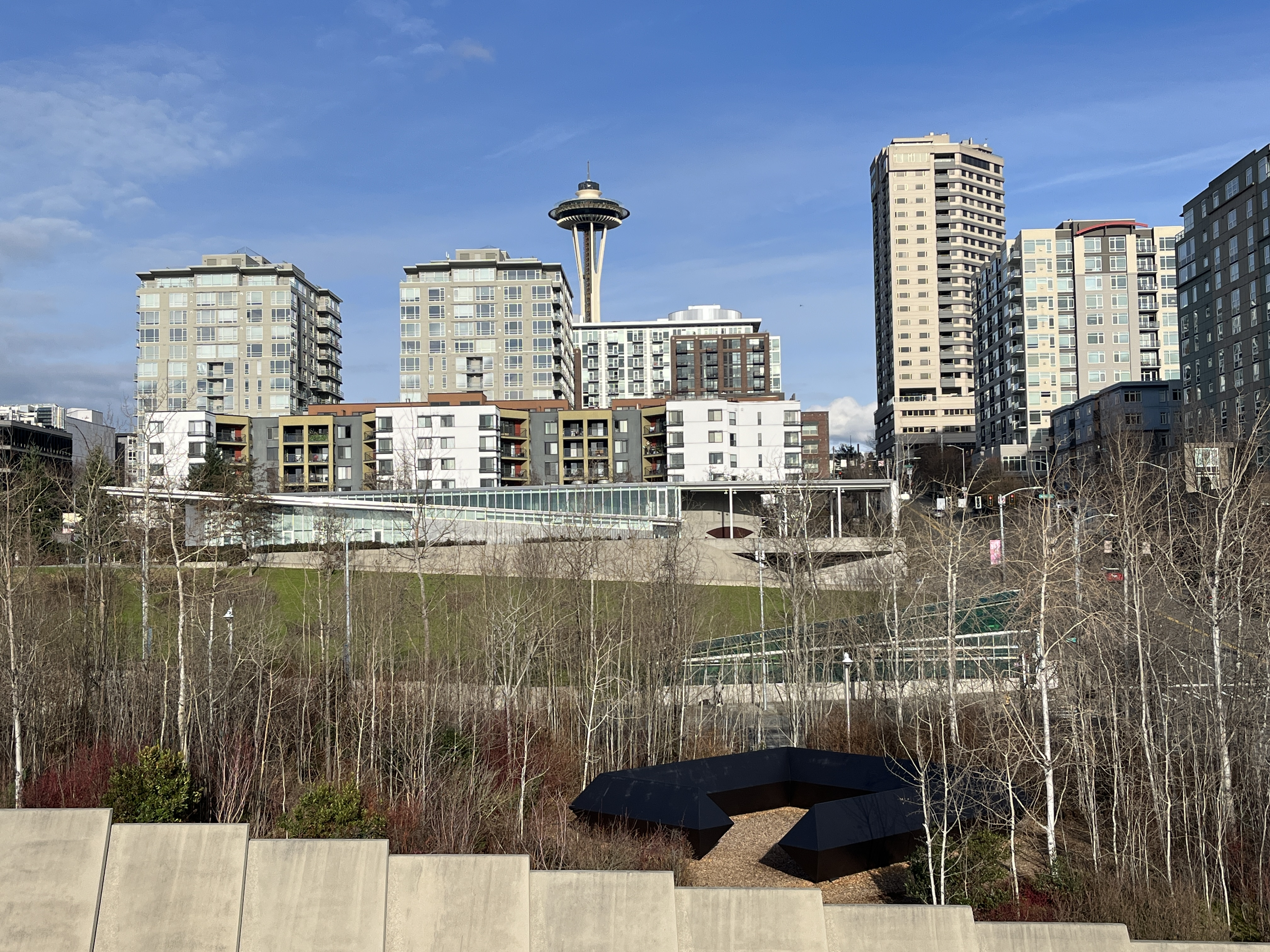
- The sculpture in the foreground, 2024
- Artist: Tony Smith
- Type: Sculpture
- Medium: Painted steel
- Location: Olympic Sculpture Park (Seattle Art Museum); Seattle, Washington; 47.615582°N 122.354827°W

Stinger is an outdoor 1967–1968/1999 painted steel sculpture by Tony Smith, installed at Olympic Sculpture Park in the neighborhood of Belltown in Seattle, Washington. It was installed there after being donated by his family.

It is attributed to Tony Smith although it was made 19 years after his death. This is because the original sculpture was finished in 1968 and was made of plywood, but Smith wanted it to be made of steel.

It was originally called One Gate, but renamed as Stinger after the cocktail that was trending at the time of its creation.

== Overview ==
It consists of a large square metal frame with many edges and an entrance in one of the sides. It is made of steel and was painted black. The original was made of plywood.

The measures for it are approximately 2,15m x 10,11m x 10,11m (6 ft 6 inches x 33 ft 4.25 inches x 33ft4.25in), thus having the perimeter of ≈32,48m (≈106,56 ft) and the area of ≈219,75m^{2} (≈730,96 ft^{2}).

== See also ==
- List of sculptures by Tony Smith
