= Playground (3/3) =

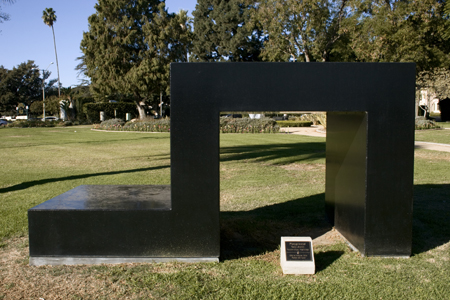
- Artist: Tony Smith
- Year: 1963, fabricated 2003
- Type: Steel, painted black
- Dimensions: 160 cm × 160 cm × 330 cm (64 in × 64 in × 128 in)
- Location: Beverly Gardens Park, Beverly Hills, California; 34°4′22.87″N 118°24′7.33″W
- Owner: City of Beverly Hills

Playground is a public artwork by American artist Tony Smith, located at Beverly Gardens Park in Beverly Hills, California. It is a welded steel sculpture surfaced with black paint. The sculpture was conceived in 1962 and cast in 2003. Situated on the edge of Beverly Gardens Park and visible from the street, this sculpture is mounted on an approximately 4” tall concrete platform. It measures 5’ 4” height x 10’ 8” width x 5’ 4” depth (163 x 325 x 163 cm).

== Description ==
Playground (3/3) was conceived during a time in Tony Smith's career when he was developing forms intended as sculptural “expressions”. The first of Smith's expressions to be made in steel was Free Ride (1962). Sketches and mock-ups in full scale were made for Playground that same year. The artist's body of work is based on natural geometry in simple forms and a preoccupation with art in a public context. Most of Smith's rectangular work date to before 1965.

The scale, form, and name of this sculpture invite onlookers to explore by crawling through its tunnel and peeking over the top. According to Smith, the profile of Playground first appeared in one of his paintings completed in 1961. He indicates that the shape of this sculpture is reminiscent of ancient mud brick buildings.

Playground (3/3) is made of welded steel and black paint, and is the third in an edition of three, in addition to an artist's proof. Playground (1/3) is located at the Memorial Art Gallery in Rochester, NY. Playground (2/3) and the artist's proof belong to private collections. In addition to large, welded steel sculptures and an artist's proof, Smith also made smaller versions of his sculptures out of cast bronze, welded bronze, or steel. In 1962, Playground was also cast in bronze with a black patina in an edition of 9, each of which measure 16” height x 16” width x 32” depth. (40.6 x 40.6 x 81.3 cm).

In his work, Smith showed great sensitivity to environmental conditions. The mock-ups for his sculptures were usually made from plywood and coated with automobile paint. The welded steel of the final, large-scale sculptures were allowed to weather and darken to match the surface quality and color created in his mock-ups. Smith sends his work to be professionally fabricated.

== Historical information ==
=== Location history ===
Playground (3/3) was conceived in 1962 and fabricated in 2003. It is currently part of the City of Beverly Hill’s public art collection, and was purchased by the City of Beverly Hill's public art fund.

== Condition ==
This artwork was not assessed in the Save Outdoor Sculpture (SOS!) 1992 - 1994 survey. Playground 3/3 was last surveyed by the Emerging Conservation Professionals Network (ECPN), which is part of the American Institute for Conservation of Historic and Artistic Works (AIC) on November 10, 2012. This survey was part of the Artist Research Project, an initiative developed by Voices in Contemporary Art (VoCA). During this 2012 survey, the sculpture was determined to be in good condition, with some possible paint loss and inpainting on many of the corners and edges, surface scratches, possible blanching, and surface grime.

== See also ==
- List of Tony Smith sculptures
- The Tony Smith Artist Research Project in Wikipedia
