= The Fourth Sign =

- Artist: Tony Smith
- Year: 1974, fabricated 1977
- Type: Steel, painted black
- Dimensions: 760 cm × 1,130 cm × 610 cm (300 in × 444 in × 240 in)
- Location: Honolulu, Hawaii; 21°17′59″N 157°49′03″W
- Owner: University of Hawaii at Manoa

The Fourth Sign is a public artwork by the American artist Tony Smith situated on the lawn outside the Art Building at the University of Hawaiʻi at Mānoa, in Honolulu, Hawaii, United States. The large sculpture is fabricated in steel, painted black, and signifies the fourth Zodiac sign, which is Cancer (a crab). The sculpture was commissioned by the Hawaii State Foundation on Culture and the Arts in accordance with the Art in State Buildings Law. Since its installation, many have seen in its shape as a reference to the legs and claws of a crab.

== Description ==
The Fourth Sign consists of nine straight sections, fused end to end to form a broken circle. Three horizontal sections rest on the ground. Using the orientation of a clock face, 12 o'clock falls at the center of one of these sections, while the other two converge on 6 o'clock, where the break occurs. Connecting these sections are two broad arches, each composed of three sections. In this way the sculpture defines its own "interior" and "exterior", and while open to the sky offers a startling sense of safe haven and enclosure.

In 1978, the Honolulu-based artist and professor of religion, John Charlot, described how quickly the university community made Smith's sculpture its own:

When he returns to Hawaii, Smith will see students draping their young bodies over his sculpture and nestle within the circle of its arms, just as they bathe under the pool under Manoa falls. This is the local reaction to what, however awesome, is beautiful and a gift.

== History ==
Smith visited Hawaii in the summer of 1969 by university invitation to teach a sculpture course. He contemplated two other projects for the campus (Haole Crater and Hubris), but only The Fourth Sign was realized.

In 1976, the Hawaii State Foundation on Culture and the Arts commissioned Mamoru Sato, a professor of art at the university and a sculptor in his own right, to oversee the fabrication of the sculpture. The work was carried out by the Hawaii Welding Company, Inc. at a total cost of $65,000. The National Endowment for the Arts Visual Arts Program supported fabrication of The Fourth Sign with a $20,000 grant.

The edition is limited to this single piece, which was completed in 1977.

== Condition ==
In 1998 it was observed that "virtually all of the outdoor pieces were in stages of disrepair – from neglect to vandalism." The sculpture was surveyed in 1994 as part of the Save Outdoor Sculpture! project, but no record of its condition exists.

== See also ==
- List of Tony Smith sculptures
- The Tony Smith Artist Research Project in Wikipedia
