= Gracehoper (2/3) =

- Artist: Tony Smith
- Year: 1962, fabricated 1988
- Type: Steel, painted black
- Dimensions: 6.91 m × 7.3 m × 14 m (22 ft 8 in × 24 ft × 46 ft)
- Location: Louisville Waterfront Park, Louisville, Kentucky; 38°15′36.87″N 85°44′55.03″W
- Owner: The Kentucky Center for the Performing Arts

Gracehoper is a public artwork by American artist Tony Smith, located in the Louisville Waterfront Park, which is in Louisville, Kentucky. This large-scale sculpture, measuring twenty-two feet high and forty six feet long, was fabricated by Lippincott, Inc in 1988, eight years after Smith's death, at a cost of one million dollars. The sculpture is made of welded steel that has been painted black.

== Description ==
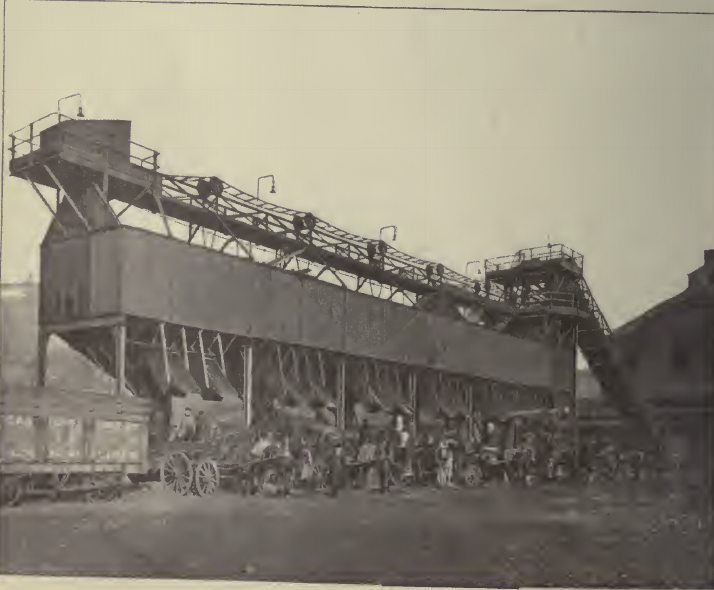
A coke hopper used to load coke onto railroad cars

The sculpture was named in part after a line in James Joyce's novel Finnegans Wake and inspired by the funnel-like form of the hoppers used to load coal into railroad cars. Smith said the title "comes from the central passage in Finnegans Wake called 'The Ondt' - corresponding to the ant-and the 'Gracehoper.' In the novel a beast named 'Gracehoper,' representing progress, change, and dynamism, takes on in battle and defeats another mythical beast, the 'Ondt,' a hardworking, conscientious but unimaginative antlike animal."

Art historian Joan Pachner described the artwork as based on Smith's "vision of an invisible space-lattice of alternating tetrahedrons and octahedrons." Smith created Gracehoper in an edition of three, with one artist's proof; this one is the second, while the Detroit Institute of Arts (DIA) has the first in its collection (Gracehoper (1/3) was fabricated by Lippincott, Inc in 1972). Additionally, the DIA has in its collection the original cardboard maquette, which was created in 1961 and is also painted black.

== Historical information ==
The sculpture was dedicated in 1989 as a gift of the Humana Foundation in appreciation of Wendell Cherry's leadership as first Chairman of the Board of The Kentucky Center for the Performing Arts. On loan to the Waterfront Development Corporation, it is located for public viewing just near the banks of the Ohio River in the Louisville Waterfront Park's "Overlook".

== Condition ==
The sculpture was last surveyed by members of Save Outdoor Sculpture! in 1994, at which time the sculpture was considered to be "well maintained". A symposium co-sponsored by the Louisville Commission on Public Art and the International Network for the Conservation of Contemporary Art - North America will be held on September 14 and 15 to discuss public art in Louisville and Gracehoper; the condition and conservation-restoration of the work will take place.

== See also ==
- List of Tony Smith sculptures
