= Light Up (sculpture) =

1974 public art sculpture by Tony Smith

- Artist: Tony Smith
- Year: 1974
- Type: Painted steel
- Dimensions: 20.6 ft × 16.6 ft × 28.6 ft (247 in × 199 in × 343 in)
- Location: Pittsburgh, Pennsylvania
- Owner: University of Pittsburgh

Light Up, often stylised as Light Up!, is a painted steel plate public art sculpture created by American artist Tony Smith and dedicated on May 15, 1974. The sculpture is located in the University of Pittsburgh's Forbes Quadrangle between Posvar Hall, the Barco Law Building, and Hillman Library. Commissioned in 1971 by Westinghouse Electric Corporation, it was originally situated in Gateway Center in downtown Pittsburgh, but was donated to the University of Pittsburgh and relocated to its Oakland campus in 1988. The sculpture was temporarily recited to the Seagram Plaza in New York City in 1998 for an exhibition of Smith's work at the Museum of Modern Art.

== History ==
In 1971, then-board-chairman of the Westinghouse Electric Corporation Donald Burnham commissioned Tony Smith for a piece of public artwork for the Gateway Center in downtown Pittsburgh. Light Up! was assembled with a crane on-site in 1974. With the help of University of Pittsburgh architect Ana Guzman, the sculpture was relocated to its current location on the University's campus.

Although generally well received at the time of its dedication, it was described as a disappointment by a news columnist for the Pittsburgh Post-Gazette for not being as "dynamic" as some of Smith's other works.

== Description ==
Light Up is 20 feet and 6 inches in height and most noted for it being a bright shade of yellow; a departure from the sculptor's more numerous black works. It combines a tetrahedron and octahedron into what Smith described as a "continuous space grid" which "may be seen as interruptions in an otherwise unbroken flow of space."

In its public settings it has been seen to be a stark comparison to the surrounding colors and shapes of its neighboring architecture, with one writer describing it in comparison to an adjacent Ludwig Mies van der Rohe skyscraper in its temporary New York retrospective setting as being "a jazzy counterpoint to its staid geometry." For this reason some posit Smith's intention, for its original setting, was to lighten up its surroundings and perhaps the attitudes of passers-by. Although Smith acknowledged that the color provided warmth against the sculpture's original backdrop which was a dark building, Smith's actual inspiration came from his observation of yellow newspaper truck driving around Pittsburgh that he had witnessed from a vantage point on the Mount Washington overlook above the city's downtown.

== See also ==
- The Tony Smith Artist Research Project in Wikipedia
- List of Tony Smith sculptures
