= Frances Perkins Building =

Headquarters of the U.S. Department of Labor

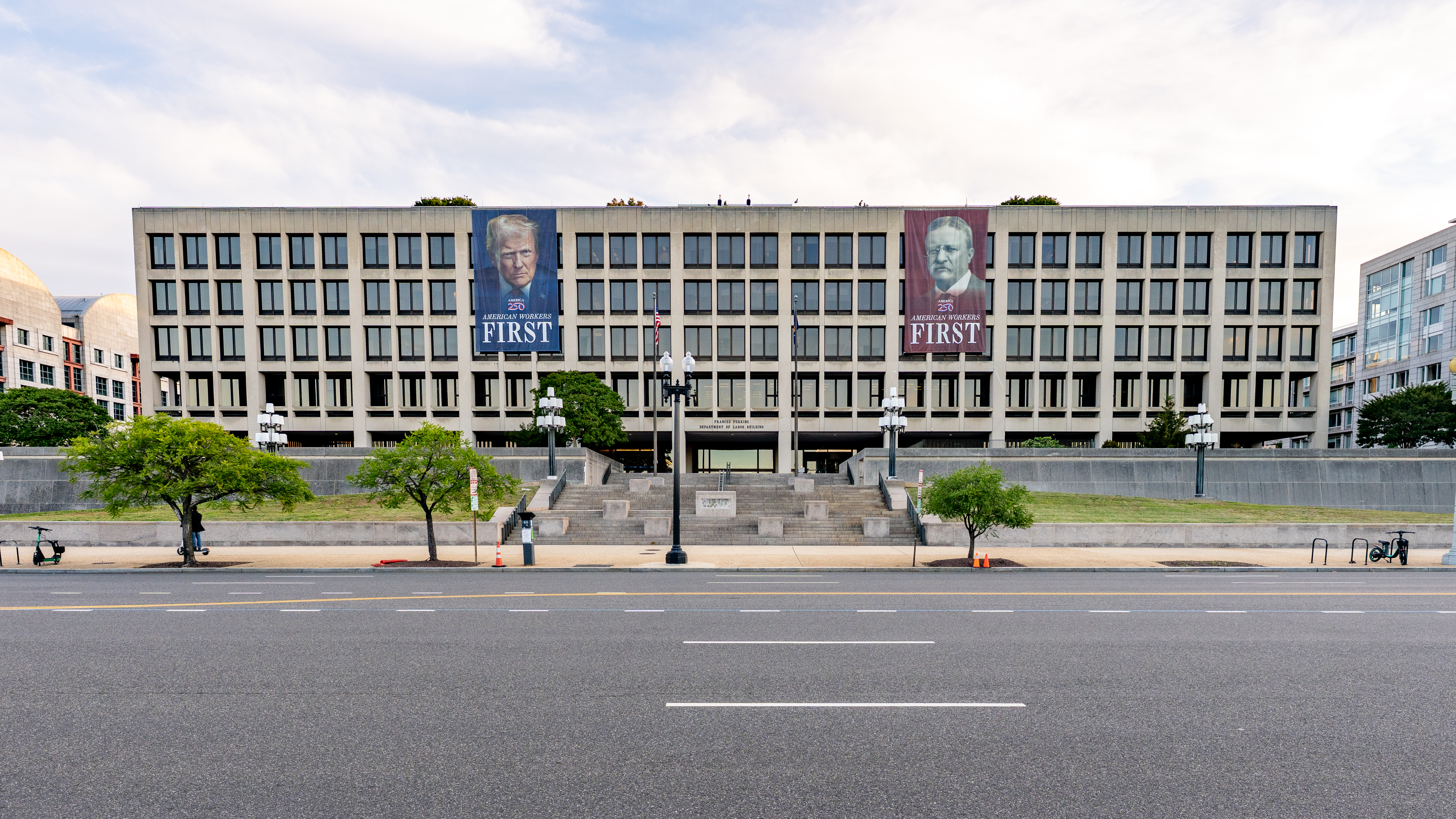
- Department of Labor headquarters in Washington, D.C.
- Interactive map of the Frances Perkins Building area
- Former names: New Labor Building
- Alternative names: Main Labor

General information
- Location: 200 Constitution Avenue NW, Washington, DC
- Coordinates: 38.893396°N 77.014514°W
- Completed: 1975
- Inaugurated: October 18, 1974

Design and construction
- Architecture firm: Brooks, Barr, Graeber and Pitts, Mebane, Phelps and White
- Main contractor: J.W. Bateson Company

The Frances Perkins Building is the Washington, D.C. headquarters of the United States Department of Labor. It is located at 200 Constitution Avenue NW and sits above Interstate 395. The structure is named after Frances Perkins, the U.S. secretary of labor from 1933–1945 and the first female cabinet secretary in U.S. history.

== History ==
During the time in office of President John F. Kennedy, planning was undertaken to consolidate most of the Department of Labor's offices, then scattered around more than twenty locations, including the headquarters Department of Labor Building, built in 1934. As part of the effort to improve and redevelop the Pennsylvania Avenue corridor, it was decided to create an entirely new building for the Labor Department in that area. The building was designed by the joint venture of Brooks, Barr, Graeber and White of Austin, Texas, and Pitts, Mebane, Phelps and White of Houston, Texas. The principal construction contractor was the J.W. Bateson Company of Dallas, Texas.

Construction on the New Labor Building (NDOL) began in the middle 1960s. When finished in 1975 the new building contained over one million square feet of usable space and cost $95 million. It was one of the first federal buildings to obtain air rights so that it could be constructed over a freeway, I-395. The ceremonial cornerstone for the NDOL was laid on October 18, 1974, with President Gerald R. Ford and Secretary Peter J. Brennan presiding. In February 1975 the first wave of employees moved in.

In 1980, the building was formally renamed for the former Secretary of Labor, Frances Perkins, based on the suggestion of a UAW employee to Senator Carl Levin of Michigan. Senator Levin was the principal sponsor of the bill to rename the building. The ceremony to rename the NDOL and dedicate it as the Frances Perkins Building was held on April 10, 1980 – the 100th anniversary of her birth. President Jimmy Carter and Secretary of Labor Ray Marshall presided over the ceremony; Senator Levin was present as well, as was Susanna Coggeshall, the daughter of Perkins. A plaque on the building said that Perkins' "legacy of social action enhances the lives of all of us." On the same day, the United States Postal Service issued a new 15-cent stamp bearing the likeness of Perkins.

=== Events ===
In April 2010, there was a meeting of the Labor and Employment Ministers of the G-20 hosted by Secretary of Labor Hilda Solis.

== Facilities ==
The building is located at the northeast corner of Constitution Avenue and 3rd Street NW. The Visitor's Entrance, referred to as the Fountain Entrance or the 3rd and C entrance, is one block north of Constitution Avenue on 3rd Street NW at 3rd and C Streets NW, on the site of the former Trinity Episcopal Church. The area is congested and the Judiciary Square station of the Washington Metro is often the best way to reach the department.

The six-story structure is made of steel and limestone. The building features the Cesar Chavez Auditorium, Wirtz Library, and the Labor Hall of Honor.

== Public art ==
The US General Service Administration commissioned works of public art by American artists for the new building. These included "She Who Must Be Obeyed" (1975) by minimalist sculptor Tony Smith and "The History of Labor in America" by new realist painter Jack Beal.

== Gallery ==
1977 – "The History of Labor in America" Series by Jack Beal

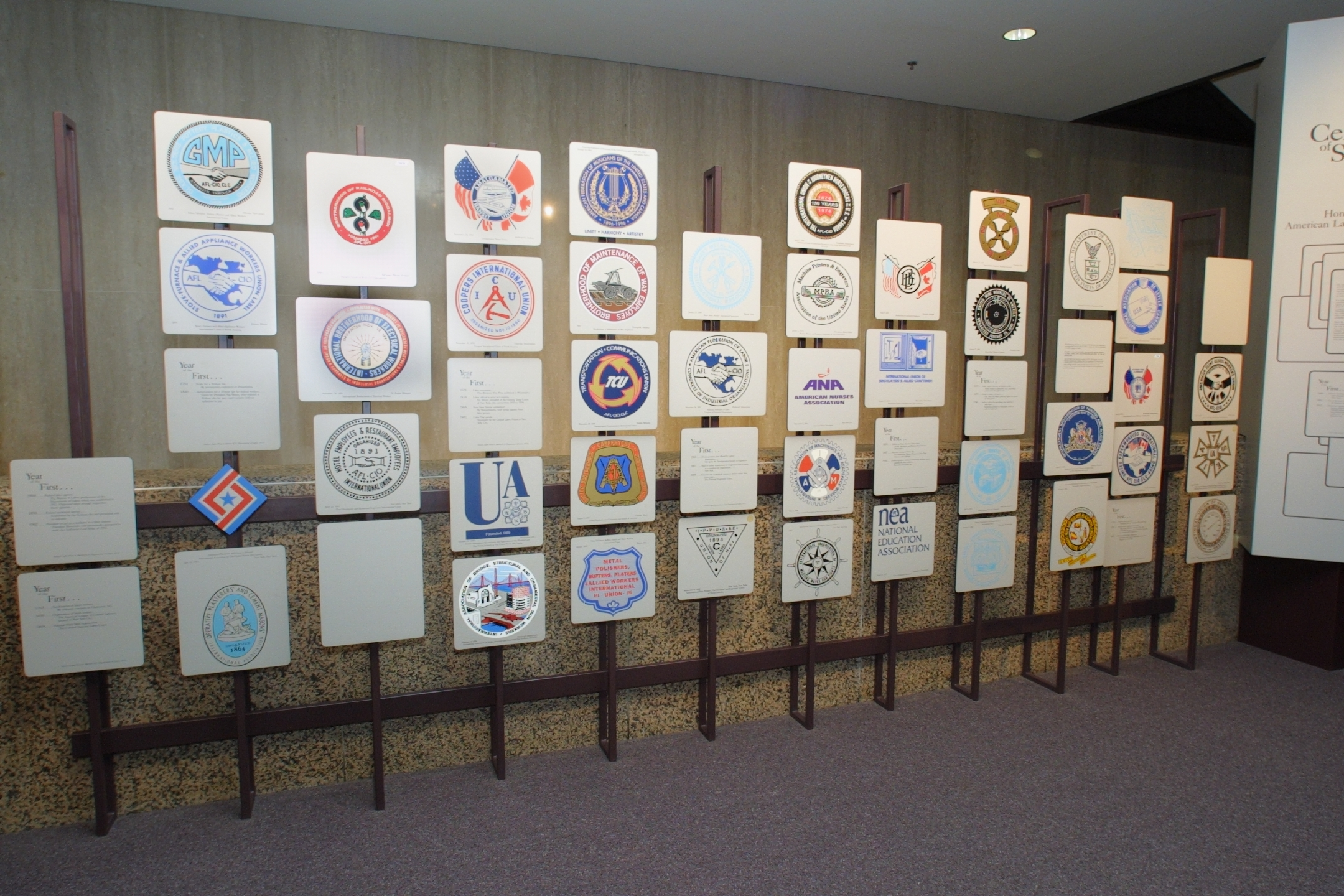
1992 - Union Plaques

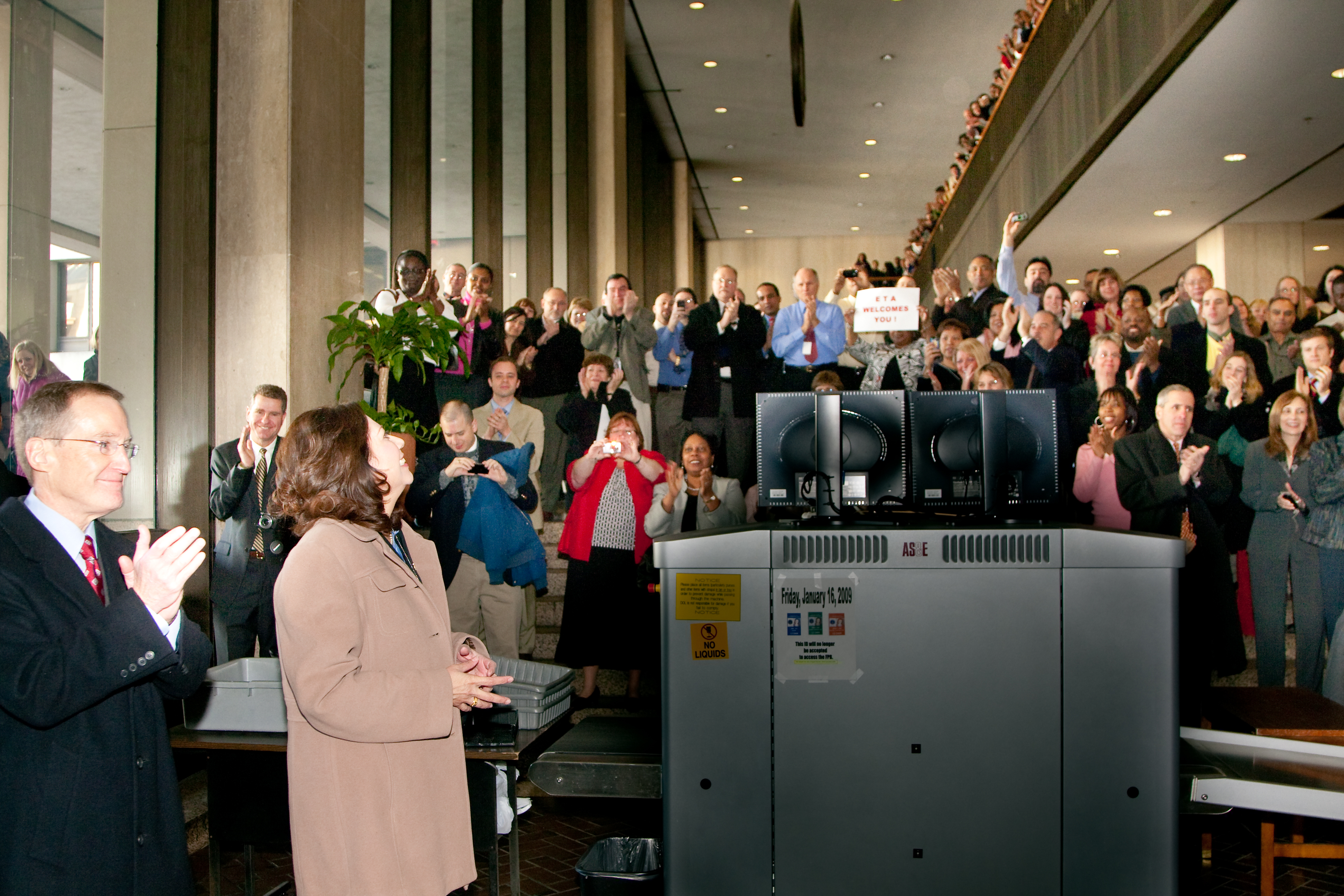
2009 - Interior of the building as new Secretary Hilda Solis arrives for the first time

2009 - She Who Must Be Obeyed

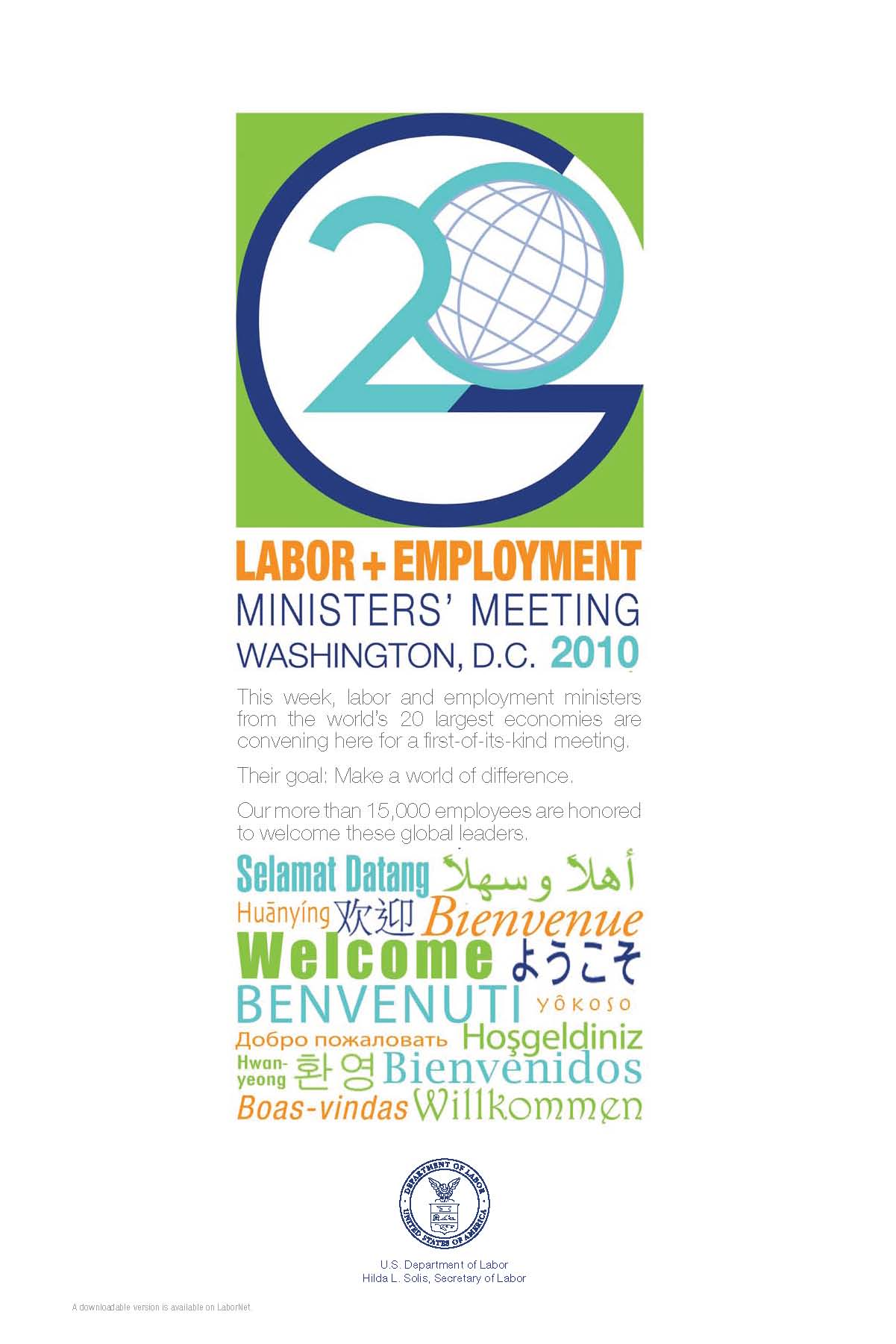
2010 - Meeting of the G-20 Ministers, held at the building

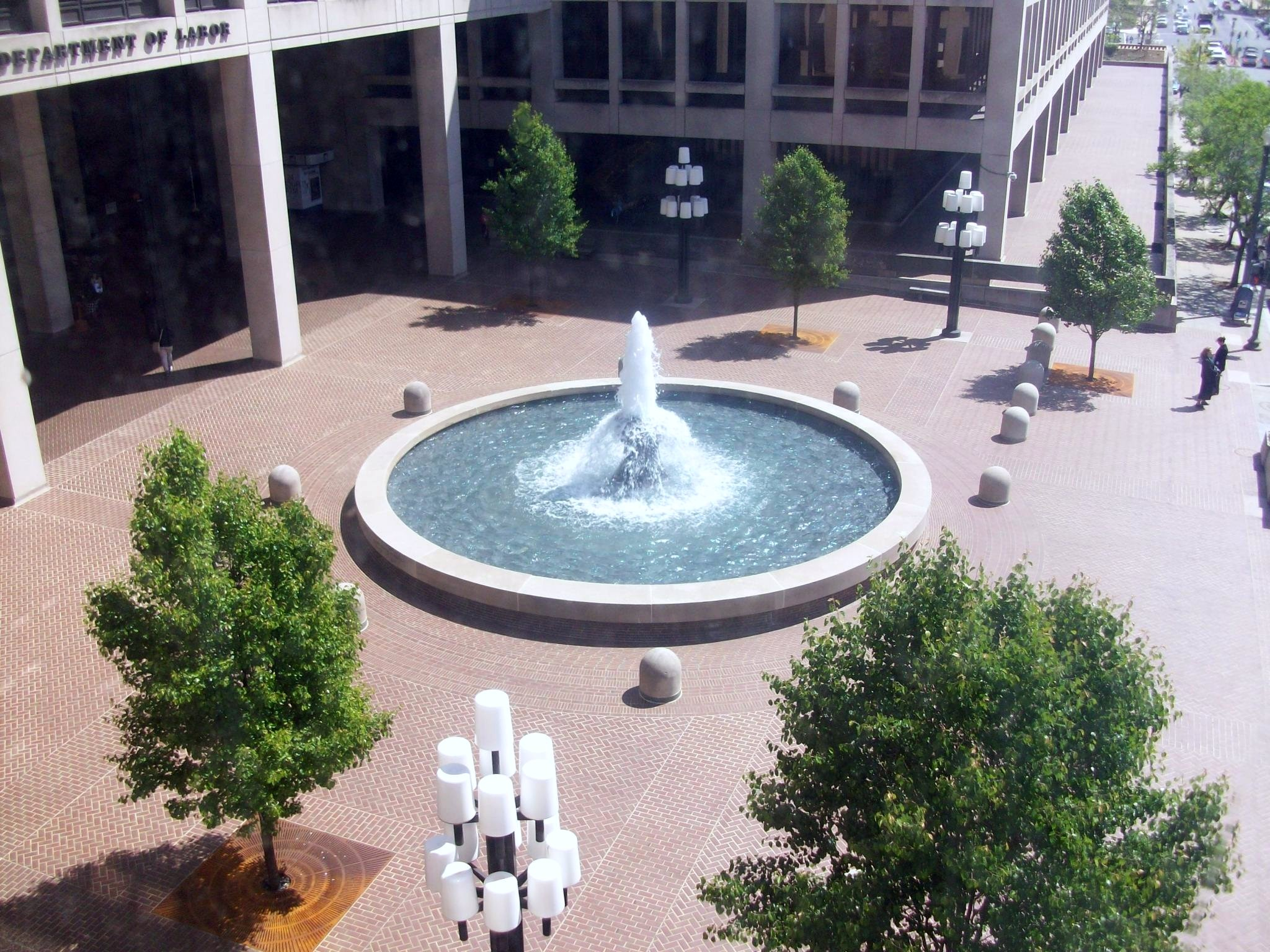
2010 - FPB Labor Fountain

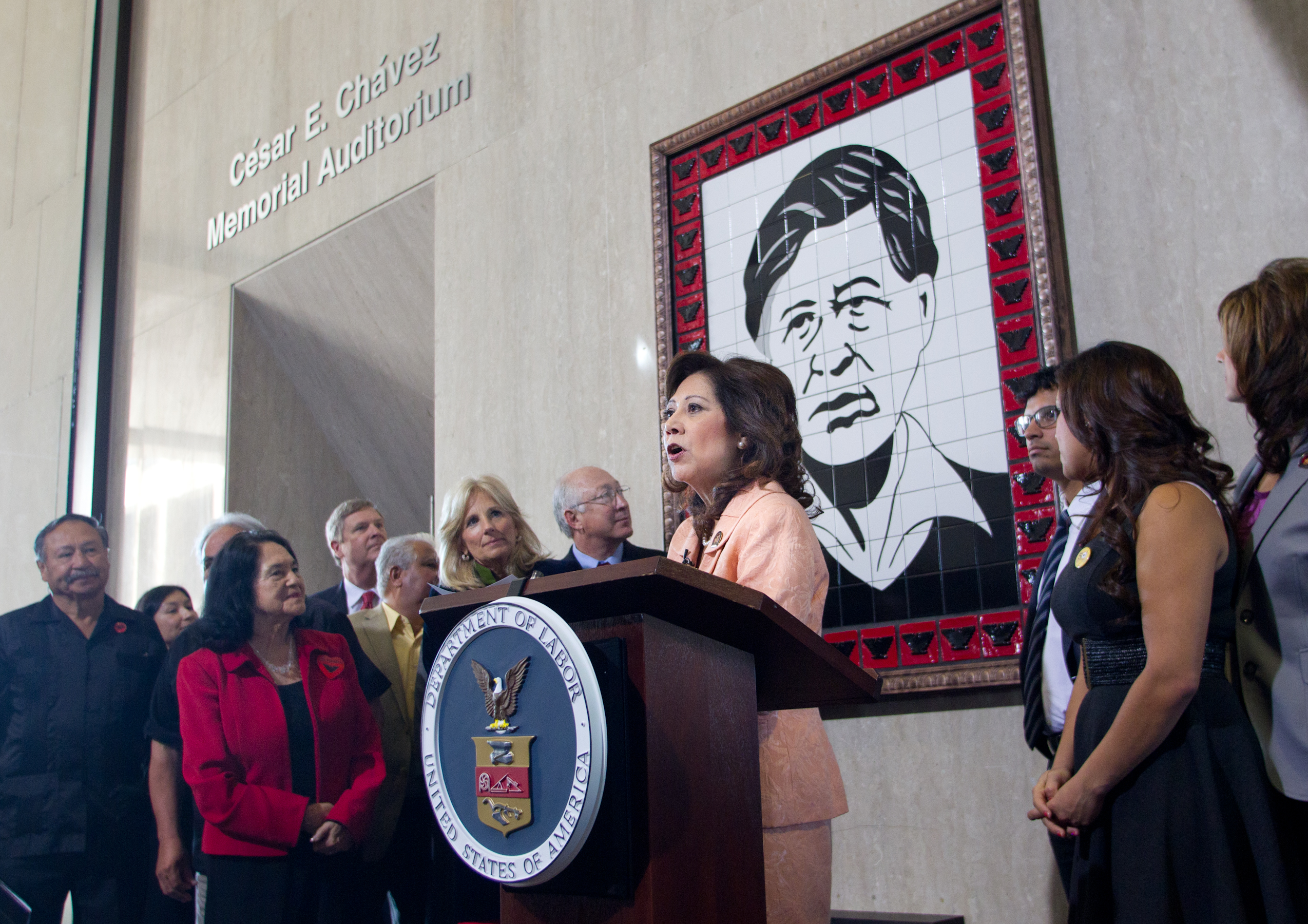
2012 - Labor Hall of Honor and the Cesar Chavez Memorial Auditorium

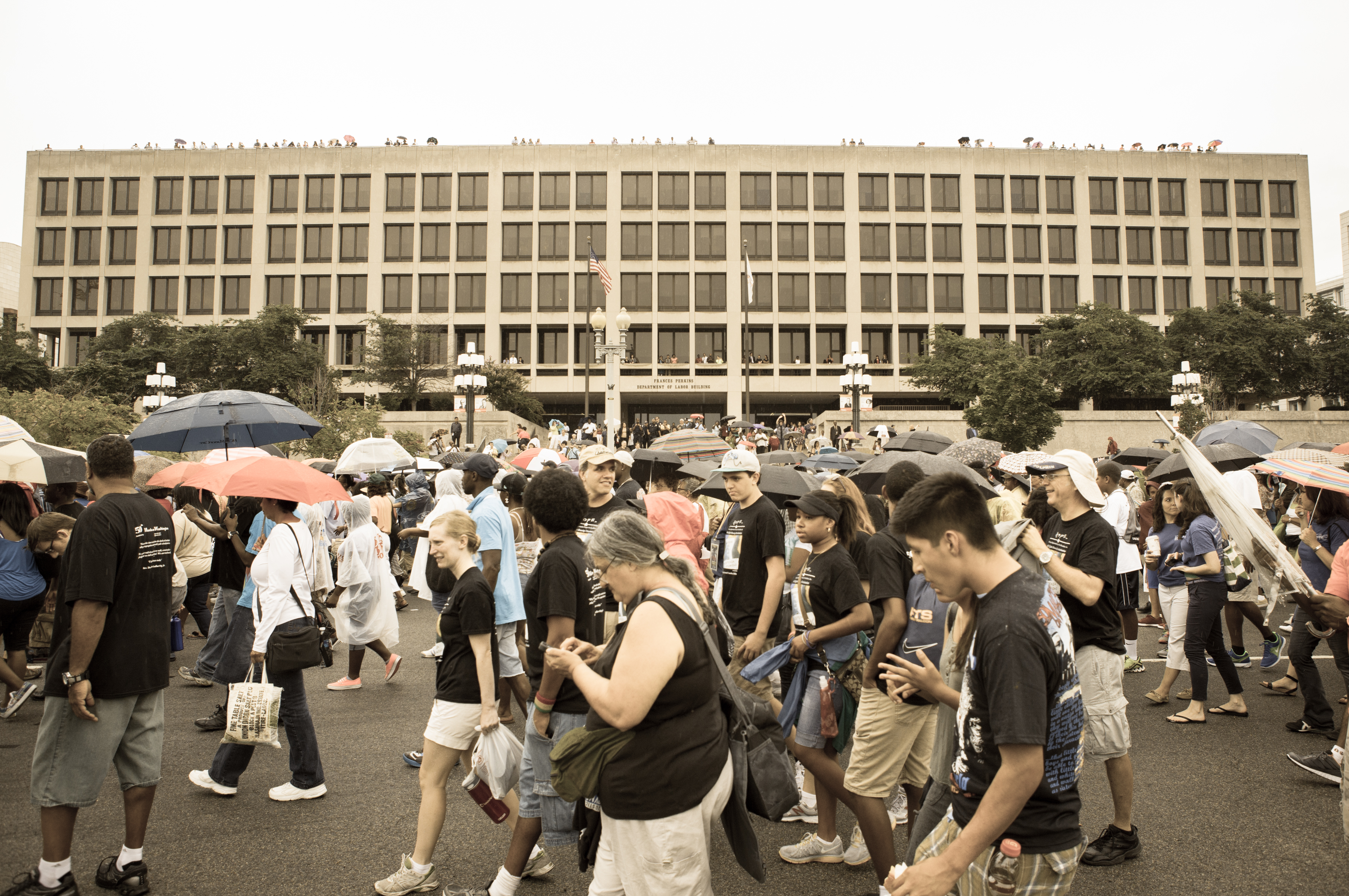
2013 - Marchers walk past the FPB as they celebrate the 50th Anniversary of the March on Washington

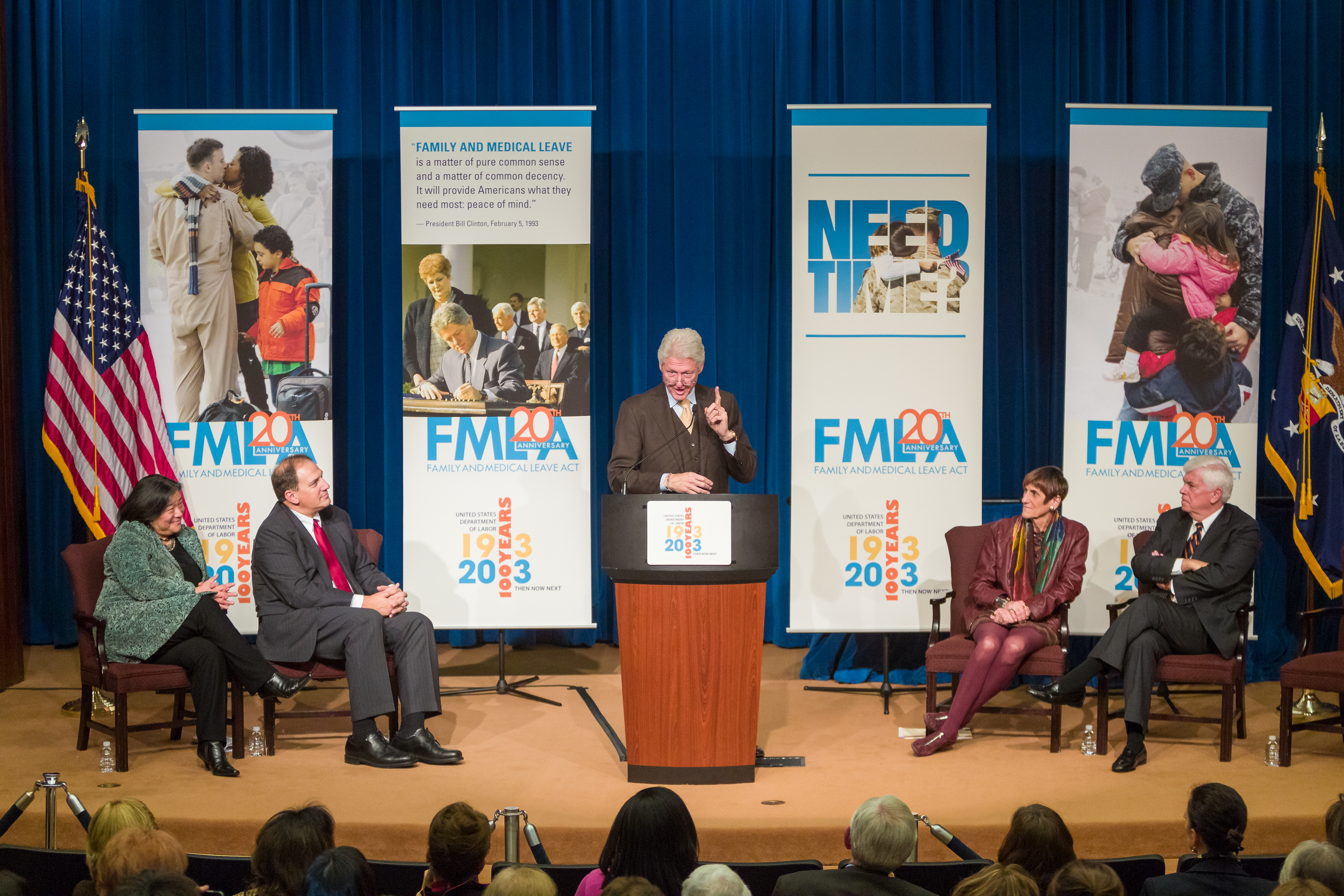
2013 - 20th anniversary of the Family and Medical Leave Act

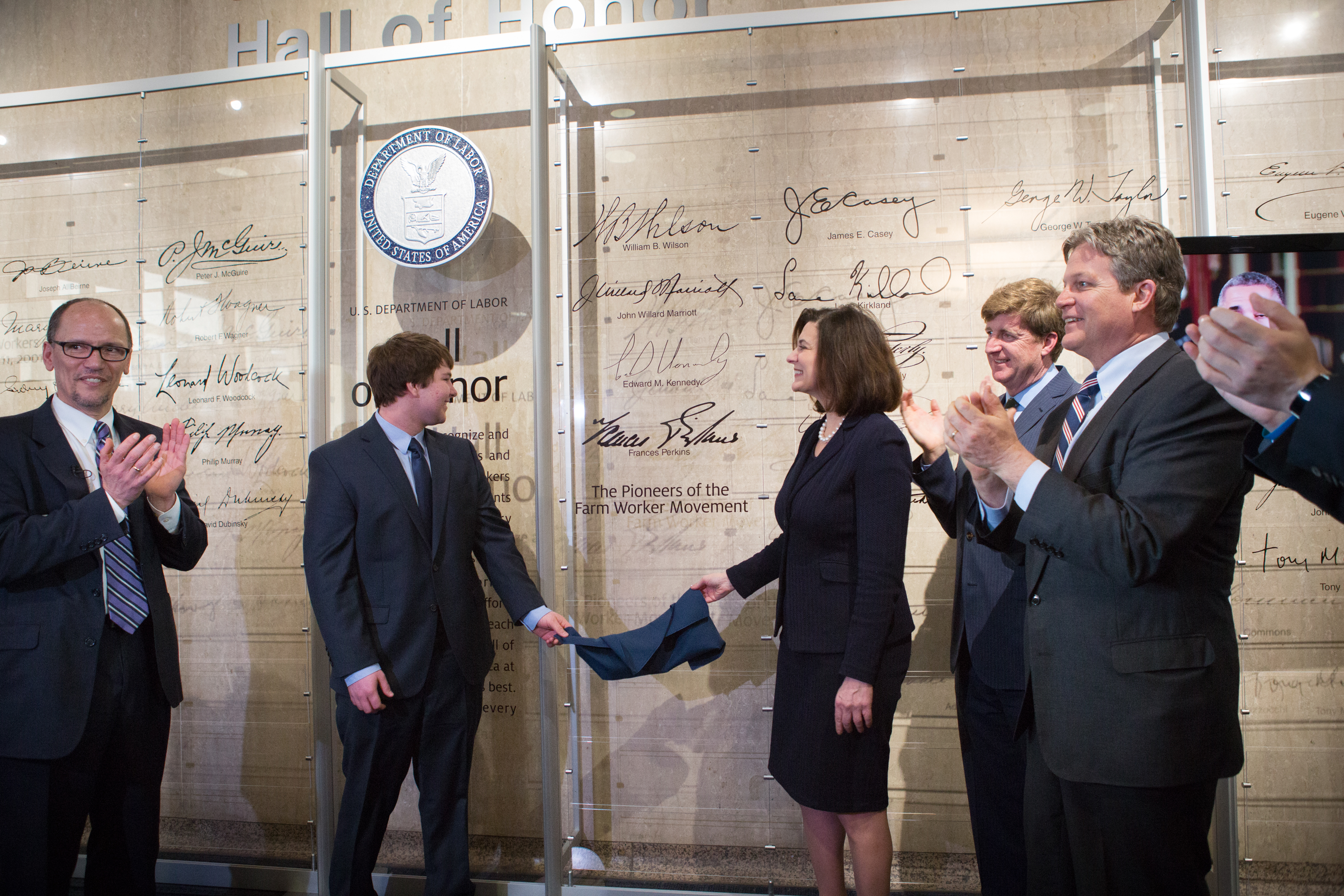
2015 - the induction ceremony of Senator Edward "Ted" Kennedy into the Department of Labor Hall of Honor
