= List of sculptures by Tony Smith =

This is a list of sculptures by Tony Smith, most of which are installed outdoors. While Smith made many artworks in a variety of media and his work as an architectural designer, he is widely known for his sculptures, which range from the small to monumental scale. No complete inventory has been published that identifies the current location of all of these works, but in the 1990s Save Outdoor Sculpture! (SOS!) participants completed an inventory and assessment of 83 of these sculptures.

Photo	Title	Year	Edition Number	Media	Dimensions	Owner	Current Location	GPS Coordinates	City	State/Country	Private or Public
	Untitled	1954		Wood	21-3/8" x 20-1/2" x 12"	Private collection					Private
	Untitled	1956		Concrete	8" x 5" x 3"	Private collection					Private
	Throne	1956-57	6/6	Steel, painted black	28" x 39" x 32"	Private collection					Private
	Untitled	1960		Wire shirt hangers, plaster, and gauze fabric	47-1/2" x 12-1/2" x 12"	Private collection					Private
	Bennington Structure	1961		Plywood, metal, lathe, and Portland cement	40' long overall, diameter of each unit approx 9'						Destroyed
	Cigarette (1/3)	1961	1/3	Steel, Cor-ten, oiled finish	15'1" × 25'6" × 18'7"	Albright–Knox Art Gallery		42°55′53.39″N 78°52′34.63″W	Buffalo	NY	Public
	Cigarette (2/3)	1961	2/3	Steel, painted black	15'1" × 25'6" × 18'7"	Museum of Modern Art	Not on view		New York City	NY	Public
	Cigarette (3/3)	1961	3/3	Steel, painted black	15'1" × 25'6" × 18'7"	Kykuit (John D. Rockefeller Estate)		41°5′20.66″N 73°50′31.21″W	Sleepy Hollow	NY	Public
	Cigarette (AP)	1962	A.P.	Steel, painted black	15'1" × 25'6" × 18'7"	Private collection					Private
	For Marjorie	1961	1/1	Steel, painted red	17' × 31'2" × 18'	Massachusetts Institute of Technology		42°21′17.11″N 71°6′9.70″W	Cambridge	MA	Public
	Light Box (AP)	1961	5/9	Cast bronze, black patina	26-1/4" x 20" x 22"	Tony Smith Estate					Private
	Marriage (1/3)	1961	1/3	Steel, painted black	10' × 10' × 12'	Norway	Carter-Menil Human Rights Foundation	59°54′36.18″N 10°44′7.04″E	Oslo	Norway	Public
	Marriage (2/3)	1961	2/3	Steel, painted black	10' × 10' × 12'	Des Moines Art Center	Pappajohn Sculpture Park	41°35′5.81″N 93°38′8.77″W	Des Moines	IA	Public
	Marriage (3/3)	1961	3/3	Steel, painted black	10' × 10' × 12'	Clos Pegase Winery		38°34′16.27″N 122°33′18.51″W	Calistoga	CA	Public
	Marriage (AP)	1961	A.P.	Steel, painted black	10' × 10' × 12'	Private collection					Private
	Spitball (1/3)	1961	1/3	Steel, painted black	11'5" × 14' × 13'4-1/2"	The Menil Collection	Not on view		Houston	TX	Public
	Spitball (2/3)	1961	2/3	Steel, painted black	11'5" × 14' × 13'4-1/2"	Case Western Reserve University	The John and Mildred Andrews Putnam Sculpture Garden	41°30′10.92″N 81°36′27.93″W	Cleveland	OH	Public
	Spitball (3/3)	1961	3/3	Steel, painted black	11'5" × 14' × 13'4-1/2"	Baltimore Museum of Art		39°19′36.56″N 76°37′6.24″W	Baltimore	MD	Public
	Spitball (AP)	1961	A.P.	Steel, painted black	11'5" × 14' × 13'4-1/2"	Private collection					Private
	Tetrahedron	1961		Plaster, gauze bandage, newspaper, armature	38" x 48" x 43"	Private collection					Private
	Tau (1/3)	1961–62	1/3	Steel, painted black	14' × 21'6" × 12'4-1/4"	Hunter College	Hunter College Art Galleries	40°46′4.18″N 73°57′51.96″W	New York	NY	Public
	Tau (AP)	1961–62	A.P.	Steel, painted black	14' × 21'6" × 12'4-1/4"	South Orange		40°45′0.96″N 74°15′40.29″W	South Orange	NJ	Public
	Beardwig (1/6)	1962	2/6	Steel, oiled finish	42" × 36" × 36"	Private collection					Private
	Beardwig (2/6)	1962	2/6	Steel, oiled finish	42" × 36" × 36"	Private collection					Private
	Black Box (1/3)	1962	1/3	Steel, oiled finish	22-1/2" × 33" × 25"	Private collection					Private
	Black Box (2/3)	1962	2/3	Steel, oiled finish	22-1/2" × 33" × 25"	National Gallery of Canada			Ottawa	Canada	Public
	Black Box (3/3)	1962	3/3	Steel, oiled finish	22-1/2" × 33" × 25"	Tony Smith Estate					Private
	Black Box (AP)	1962	A.P.	Steel, oiled finish	22-1/2" × 33" × 25"	Private collection					Private
	Cross (AP)	1960-62	A.P.	Cast bronze, black patina	32" × 32" × 32"	Private Collection					Private
	Die (1/3)	1962	1/3	Steel, oiled finish	6' × 6' × 6'	Whitney Museum of American Art			New York	NY	Public
	Die (2/3)	1962	2/3	Steel, oiled finish	6' × 6' × 6'	National Gallery of Art	Installed indoors		Washington	DC	Public
	Die (3/3)	1962	3/3	Steel, oiled finish	6' × 6' × 6'	Private collection					Private
	Die (AP)	1962	A.P.	Steel, oiled finish	6' × 6' × 6'	The Museum of Modern Art			New York	NY	Public
	Free Ride (1/3)	1962	1/3	Steel, oiled finish	6'8" × 6'8" × 6'8"	Private collection					Private
	Free Ride (2/3)	1962	2/3	Steel, oiled finish	6'8" × 6'8" × 6'8"	Saint Louis Art Museum			St. Louis	MO	Public
	Free Ride (3/3)	1962	3/3	Steel, painted black	6'8" × 6'8" × 6'8"	The Museum of Modern Art			New York	NY	Public
	Free Ride (AP)	1962	A.P.	Steel, painted black	6'8" × 6'8" × 6'8"	Private collection					Private
	Gracehoper (1/3)	1962	1/3	Steel, painted black	22'8" × 24' × 46'	Detroit Institute of Arts		42°21′36.21″N 83°3′55.29″W	Detroit	MI	Public
	Gracehoper (2/3)	1962	2/3	Steel, painted black	22'8" × 24' × 46'	The Kentucky Center for the Performing Arts		38°15′36.87″N 85°44′55.03″W	Louisville	KY	Public
	Gracehoper (3/3)	1962	3/3	Steel, painted black	22'8" × 24' × 46'	Private Collection		30°20′57.73″N 97°47′22.82″W	Austin	TX	Private
	Night (1/3)	1962	1/3	Steel, painted black	12' × 12' × 16'	Private collection					Private
	Night (2/3)	1962	2/3	Steel, painted black	12' × 12' × 16'	Private collection					Private
	Night (3/3)	1962	3/3	Steel, painted black	12' × 12' × 16'	Gateway Foundation	Citygarden	38°37′37.53″N 90°11′38.06″W	St. Louis	MO	Public
	Night (AP)	1962	A.P.	Steel, painted black	12' × 12' × 16'	Private collection					Private
	Playground (1/3)	1962	1/3	Steel, painted black	5'4" × 10'8" × 5'4"	Memorial Art Gallery		43°9′25.51″N 77°35′18.09″W	Rochester	NY	Public
	Playground (2/3)	1962	2/3	Steel, painted black	5'4" × 10'8" × 5'4"	Private collection					Private
	Playground (3/3)	1962	3/3	Steel, painted black	5'4" × 10'8" × 5'4"	City of Beverly Hills	Beverly Gardens Park	34°4′22.87″N 118°24′7.33″W	Hollywood	CA	Public
	Playground (AP)	1962	A.P.	Steel, painted black	5'4" × 10'8" × 5'4"	Private collection					Private
	Ringcross	1962	A.P.	Wood	30" × 30" × 30"	Private collection					Private
	The Snake Is Out (1/3)	1962	1/3	Steel, painted black	15'1-1/2" × 23' 2" × 18'10"	Empire State Plaza Art Collection	Governor Nelson A. Rockefeller Empire State Plaza	42°39′0.66″N 73°45′40.03″W	Albany	NY	Public
	The Snake Is Out (2/3)	1962	2/3	Steel, painted black	15'1-1/2" × 23' 2" × 18'10"	The Menil Collection	Not on view		Houston	TX	Public
	The Snake Is Out (3/3)	1962	3/3	Steel, painted black	15'1-1/2" × 23' 2" × 18'10"	Nasher Sculpture Center		32°52′16.4″N 96°49′43.94″W	Dallas	TX	Public
	The Snake Is Out (AP)	1962	A.P.	Steel, painted black	15'1-1/2" × 23' 2" × 18'10"	National Gallery of Art		38°53′27.64″N 77°1′2.53″W	Washington	DC	Public
	Tower of the Winds (1/6)	1962	1/6	Cast bronze, black patina	33" x 33" x 33"	Institut Valencia d'Art Modern			Valencia	Spain	Public
	We Lost (1/3)	1962	1/3	Steel, painted black	10'8" × 10'8" × 10'8"	University of Pennsylvania		39°57′9.93″N 75°11′20.8″W	Philadelphia	PA	Public
	We Lost (2/3)	1962	2/3	Steel, painted black	10'8" × 10'8" × 10'8"	Matthew Marks Gallery					Private
	We Lost (3/3)	1962	3/3	Steel, painted black	10'8" × 10'8" × 10'8"	Private collection					Private
	Wingbone	1962		Plaster, gauze bandage, newspaper, armature	2'2" x 2'1" x 9'8"	Solomon R. Guggenheim Museum			New York	NY	Public
	Willy (1/3)	1962	1/3	Steel, painted black	7'7-1/4" × 18'8" × 11'3"	University of Nebraska–Lincoln	Sheldon Museum of Art and Sculpture Garden	40°49′1.01″N 96°42′19.36″W	Lincoln	NE	Public
	Willy (2/3)	1962	2/3	Steel, painted black	7'7-1/4" × 18'8" × 11'3"	Dallas Museum of Art		32°47′11.74″N 96°48′0.07″W	Dallas	TX	Public
	Willy (3/3)	1962	3/3	Steel, painted black	7'7-1/4" × 18'8" × 11'3"	Hansol Art Foundation (Hansol)			Seoul	South Korea	Public
	Willy (AP)	1962	A.P.	Steel, painted black	7'7-1/4" × 18'8" × 11'3"	Des Moines Art Center		41°35′6.13″N 93°38′11″W	Des Moines	IA	Public
	Duck (1/3)	1962–63	1/3	Steel, painted black	11'4" × 13'10" × 9'3"	Donald M. Kendall Sculpture Gardens		41°2′13.81″N 73°41′39.91″W	Purchase	NY	Public
	Duck (2/3)	1962–63	2/3	Steel, painted black	11'4" × 13'10" × 9'3"	Private collection					Private
	Duck (3/3)	1962–63	3/3	Steel, painted black	11'4" × 13'10" × 9'3"	Private collection					Private
	Duck (AP)	1962–63	A.P.	Steel, painted black	11'4" × 13'10" × 9'3"	Private collection					Private
	Memphis	1962–63	1/6	Bronze, painted red, blue, ochre	81.3 x 63.5 x 63.5 cm	Pace Gallery					Private
	Mistake	1963	6/9	Cast bronze, black patina	12" x 12" x 8"	Private Collection					Private
	The Elevens Are Up (1/3)	1963	1/3	Steel, painted black	8' × 8' × 8', (2 units, each 8' × 2' × 8')	The Menil Collection		29°44′9.12″N 95°23′53.09″W	Houston	TX	Public
	The Elevens Are Up (2/3)	1963	2/3	Steel, painted black	8' × 8' × 8', (2 units, each 8' × 2' × 8')	Private collection					Private
	The Elevens Are Up (3/3)	1963	3/3	Steel, painted black	8' × 8' × 8', (2 units, each 8' × 2' × 8')	Private collection					Private
	The Elevens Are Up (AP)	1963	A.P.	Steel, painted black	8' × 8' × 8', (2 units, each 8' × 2' × 8')	Louisiana Museum of Modern Art			Humlebæk	Denmark	Public
	Moondog (1/3)	1964	1/3	Aluminum, painted black	17'1-1/4" × 13'7-1/4" × 15'8-1/2"	Benesse Corporation			Tokyo	Japan	Public
	Moondog (2/3)	1964	2/3	Aluminum, painted black	17'1-1/4" × 13'7-1/4" × 15'8-1/2"	Private collection					Private
	Moondog (3/3)	1964	3/3	Aluminum, painted black	17'1-1/4" × 13'7-1/4" × 15'8-1/2"	National Gallery of Art		38°53′27.31″N 77°1′21.85″W	Washington	DC	Public
	Moondog (AP)	1964	A.P.	Aluminum, painted black	17'1-1/4" × 13'7-1/4" × 15'8-1/2"	The Museum of Modern Art			New York	NY	Public
	Wall (1/3)	1964	1/3	Steel, painted black	8' × 2' × 18'	The Menil Collection		29°44′8.36″N 95°23′52.81″W	Houston	TX	Public
	Wall (2/3)	1964	2/3	Steel, painted black	8' × 2' × 18'	Private collection					Private
	Wall (3/3)	1964	3/3	Steel, painted black	8' × 2' × 18'	Tony Smith Estate					Private
	Wall (AP)	1964	1/3	Steel, painted black	8' × 2' × 18'	Private collection					Private
	Amaryllis (1/3)	1965	1/3	Cor-Ten Steel, Painted black	11'6" × 7'6" × 11'6"	Wadsworth Atheneum			Hartford	CT	Public
	Amaryllis (2/3)	1965	2/3	Cor-Ten Steel, Painted black	11'6" × 7'6" × 11'6"	Walker Art Center		44°58′10.88″N 93°17′21.78″W	Minneapolis	MN	Public
	Amaryllis (3/3)	1965	3/3	Cor-Ten Steel, Painted black	11'6" × 7'6" × 11'6"	Shizuoka Prefectural Museum of Art			Shizuoka-Shi, Ikeda	Japan	Public
	Amaryllis (AP)	1965	A.P.	Cor-Ten Steel, Painted black	11'6" × 7'6" × 11'6"	The Metropolitan Museum of Art	University of Texas, Austin	30°17′12.96″N 97°43′54.38″W	New York	NY	Public
	Generation (1/3)	1965	1/3	Aluminum, painted black	33'11" × 36'11" × 36'11"	Private collection					Private
	The Keys To Given! (1/3)	1965	1/3	Steel, painted black	8' × 8' × 8'	High Museum of Art			Atlanta	GA	Public
	The Keys To Given! (2/3)	1965	2/3	Steel, painted black	8' × 8' × 8'	Private collection					Private
	The Keys To Given! (3/3)	1965	3/3	Steel, painted black	8' × 8' × 8'	Private collection					Private
	The Keys To Given! (AP)	1965	A.P.	Steel, painted black	8' × 8' × 8'	Private collection					Private
	Fixture	1966		Plywood mock-up, site specific	16' x 32' x 18'	Wadsworth Atheneum, Hartford, CT					Destroyed
	New Piece (1/3)	1966	1/3	Steel, painted black	6'11" × 12' × 14'2"	The Menil Collection		29°44′7.6″N 95°23′53.07″W	Houston	TX	Public
	New Piece (2/3)	1966	2/3	Steel, painted black	6'11" × 12' × 14'2"	Institute for Advanced Study		40°19′46.08″N 74°40′4.99″W	Princeton	NJ	Public
	New Piece (3/3)	1966	3/3	Steel, painted black	6'11" × 12' × 14'2"	Private collection					Private
	New Piece (AP)	1966	3/3	Steel, painted black	6'11" × 12' × 14'2"	Ton Smith Estate					Private
	Dial (6+AP)	1967	6+A.P.	Cast bronze, black patina	15" x 14" x 14"	Tony Smith Estate					Private
	Maze (2/3)	1967	2/3	Steel, painted black	4 units total: 2 units each 6'8" x 10' x 2'6" and 2 units each 6'8" x 5' x 2'6"	Private collection					Private
	Smoke (1/3)	1967	1/3	Aluminum, painted black	24'2" × 47' × 33'	Los Angeles County Museum of Art	Installed in the Ahmanson Building Room		Los Angeles	CA	Public
	Smoke (2/3)	1967	2/3	Aluminum, painted black	24'2" × 47' × 33'	Private collection					Private
	Source (1/3)	1967	1/3	Steel, painted black	11' × 29'6" × 34'	Cleveland Museum of Art	Donna and Stewart Kohl Sculpture Garden	41°30′35.05″N 81°36′39.62″W	Cleveland	OH	Public
	Source (2/3)	1967	2/3	Steel, painted black	11' × 29'6" × 34'	Tony Smith Estate	Storm King Art Center		New Windsor	NY	Private
	Wandering Rocks (1/5)	1967	1/5	Stainless steel	Five units, 23" to 45-1/2" high	Kykuit (John D. Rockefeller Estate)			Sleepy Hollow	NY	Public
	Wandering Rocks (2/5)	1967	2/5	Steel, painted black	Five units, 23" to 45-1/2" high	Lynden Sculpture Garden		43°10′36.03″N 87°56′12.99″W	Milwaukee	WI	Public
	Wandering Rocks (3/5)	1967	3/5	Steel, painted black	Five units, 23" to 45-1/2" high	Private collection	Unknown!				Private
	Wandering Rocks (4/5)	1967	4/5	Steel, painted black	Five units, 23" to 45-1/2" high	National Gallery of Art		38°53′30.42″N 77°1′22.62″W	Washington	DC	Public
	Wandering Rocks (5/5)	1967	5/5	Steel, painted black	Five units, 23" to 45-1/2" high	Kröller-Müller Museum			Otterlo	Netherlands	Public
	Wandering Rocks (AP)	1967	A.P.	Steel, painted black	Five units, 23" to 45-1/2" high	Seattle Art Museum	Olympic Sculpture Park	47°36′56.88″N 122°21′18.8″W	Seattle	WA	Public
	Stinger	1967–68	1/3	Steel, painted black	6'6" × 33'4-1/2" × 33'4-1/2"	Seattle Art Museum	Olympic Sculpture Park	47°36′56.08″N 122°21′17.32″W	Seattle	WA	Public
	Arch	1968		Plywood mock-up, painted	16' x 22' x 22' (platform 9'H front x 4'H back)	Sonsbeek Park			Arnhem	Netherlands	Destroyed
	Arm	1968		Plywood mock-up, painted black	4' x 21' x 12'	Hakone Open-Air Museum Exhibition			Hakone	Japan	Destroyed
	Asteriskos	1968	1/1	Steel, painted black	16'8" × 16'8" × 16'8"	McNay Art Museum		29°29′7.16″N 98°27′23.56″W	San Antonio	TX	Public
	Equinox	1968		Steel, oiled finish	76.8 x 106.7 x 108 cm	Pace Gallery					Private
	Moses (1/3)	1968	1/3	Steel, painted black	11'6" × 15' × 7'4"	Princeton University		40°20′51.31″N 74°39′24.86″W	Princeton	NJ	Public
	Moses (2/3)	1968	2/3	Steel, painted black	11'6" × 15' × 7'4"	City of Seattle	Seattle Center	47°37′14.79″N 122°20′55.9″W	Seattle	WA	Public
	Moses (3/3)	1968	3/3	Steel, painted black	11'6" × 15' × 7'4"	Toledo Museum of Art		41°39′31.94″N 83°33′33.49″W	Toledo	OH	Public
	Moses (AP)	1968	A.P.	Steel, painted black	11'6" × 15' × 7'4"	Private collection					Private
	Seed (1/3)	1968	1/3	Steel, painted black	48" × 48" × 48"	Private collection					Private
	Seed (AP)	1968	A.P.	Steel, painted black	48" × 48" × 48"	Private collection					Private
	Trap (3/9)	1968	3/9	Cast bronze	10" × 55" × 55"	Private collection			Birmingham	Alabama	Private
	Trunk	1968		Plywood mock-up, painted black	4' x 29'8" x 12'	Hakone Open-Air Museum Exhibition			Hakone	Japan	Destroyed
	Batcave	1969-71		Full scale cardboard, 2379 tetrahedral units, 1210 octahedral units	14'11-5/8" X 38'-1/8"X 42'6"	with Container Corporation of America as part of the Art and Technology Program at LACMA					Destroyed
	For M.S. (1/6) Mamoru Sato	1969	1/6	Welded bronze, black patina	2'9" × 13'6" × 6'8"	Phillips Exeter Academy			Exeter	NH	Public
	For M.S. (2/6)	1969	2/6	Welded bronze, black patina	2'9" × 13'6" × 6'8"	Institut Valencià d'Art Modern			Valencia	Spain	Public
	For D.C. (2/6) Dominique Charlot	1969	2/6	Welded bronze, black patina	2'9" x 13'4" x 6'8"				Seoul	Korea	Public
	For P.C. (2/6) Peter Clarke	1969	2/6	Steel, painted black	6'3" × 6'8" × 5'9"	Kunstsammlung Nordrhein-Westfalen			Düsseldorf	Germany	Public
	For P.C. (3/6)	1969	2/6	Steel, painted black	6'3" × 6'8" × 5'9"	Cleveland Museum of Art	Not on view		Cleveland	OH	Public
	For V.T. (2/6)	1969	2/6	Welded bronze, black patina	2'4" × 4'8" × 7'	Museum of Fine Arts, Boston			Boston	MA	Public
	For W.A. (1/6) Webster Anderson	1969	1/6	Welded bronze, black patina	2 units, each 5' × 5'6" × 2'9" overall: 5' × 11' × 2'9"	Solomon R. Guggenheim Museum			New York	NY	Public
	For J.C. (2/6) Jean Charlot	1969	2/6	Welded bronze, black patina	6'8" × 6'8" × 4'9"	The Newark Museum			Newark	NJ	Public
	For D.G. (1/6) David Gregory	1969	1/6	Welded bronze, black patina	2'4" × 6'8" × 6'8"	Yale University Art Gallery			New Haven	CT	Public
	For D.G. (2/6)	1969	2/6	Welded bronze, black patina	2'4" × 6'8" × 6'8"	Iris & B. Gerald Cantor Center for Visual Arts			Stanford	CA	Public
	For P.N. (1/6) Prithwish Neogy	1969	1/6	Welded bronze, black patina	2'4" × 6'8" × 6'8"	Ho-Am Museum			Seoul	Korea	Public
	For P.N. (2/6)	1969	2/6	Welded bronze, black patina	2'4" × 6'8" × 6'8"	Yale University Art Gallery			New Haven	CT	Public
	For J.W. (1/6) John Wisnosky	1969	1/6	Welded bronze, black patina	2'9" × 5' × 3'10"	Frederik Meijer Gardens & Sculpture Park		42°58′49.7″N 85°35′18.61″W	Grand Rapids	MI	Public
	For J.W. (2/6)	1969	2/6	Welded bronze, black patina	2'9" × 5' × 3'10"	Iris & B. Gerald Cantor Center for Visual Arts			Stanford	CA	Public
	Hubris	1969	1/9	Cast bronze, black patina	5" x 82-1/4" x 41"	Private Collection					Private
	Smog (1/3)	1969–70	1/3	Aluminum, painted black	6'10" × 78' × 64'	Middlebury College	Middlebury College campus	44°0′46.42″N 73°10′50.34″W	Middlebury	VT	Public
	Smog	1969–70		Aluminum, painted black	6'10" × 78' × 64'	Private collection					
	Bees Do It	1970		Wood model	13-1/2" x 15-1/4" x 11"	Private Collection					Private
	Moebius Strip	1970		Black Belgian marble	5-3/4" x 12"	Museum of Modern Art			New York	NY	Public
	Eighty-One More	1970-71		Plywood mock-up, painted red	4'7" x 41'6" x 41'6"	Museum of Modern Art			New York	NY	Public
	Light Up	1971	1/1	Steel, painted yellow	21' × 29' × 17' or 20'9" × 28'7" × 16'6"	University of Pittsburgh		40°26′31.15″N 79°57′16.27″W	Pittsburgh	PA	Public
	Yellowbird	1971		Cardboard model, painted yellow	6" x 9" x 3-1/4"	Private Collection					Private
	She Who Must Be Obeyed	1971–72	1/1	Steel, painted blue	20'9-3/8" × 33'6" × 16'	General Services Administration	Frances Perkins Building	38°53′38.35″N 77°0′56.61″W	Washington	DC	Public
	Fermi	1973		Carrara marble	28" x 42" x 28"	Private Collection					Private
	Smug	1973	1/1	Aluminum, painted black	11' × 78' × 64'	Glenstone Museum		39°3′32.42″N 77°14′57.11″W	Potomac	MD	Public
	For Delores	1973-74		Carrara marble	44-1/4" x 44-3/4" x 45-1/4"	Nasher Sculpture Center			Dallas	TX	Public
	The Fourth Sign	1974	1/1	Steel, painted black	15' × 37' × 20'	University of Hawaii		21°17′59.29″N 157°49′3.13″W	Honolulu	HI	Public
	Ten Elements (1/3)	1975–79	1/3	Aluminum, painted black	10 elements, each approx. 4' high	Private collection					Private
	Ten Elements (2/3)	1975–79	2/3	Aluminum, painted black	10 elements, each approx. 4' high	Nasher Sculpture Center			Dallas	TX	Public
	Ten Elements (3/3)	1975–79	3/3	Aluminum, painted black	10 elements, each approx. 4' high	Private collection					Private
	Ten Elements (AP)	1975–79	A.P.	Aluminum, painted black	10 elements, each approx. 4' high	Private collection					Private
	Lippizzaner	1976	1/1	Steel, painted white	101" × 96" × 123"	New Orleans Museum of Art		29°59′9.98″N 90°5′35.92″W	New Orleans	LA	Public
	One-Two-Three (1/3)	1976	1/3	Steel, painted black	Three units	Whitney Museum of American Art			New York	NY	Public
	One-Two-Three (2/3)	1976	2/3	Steel, painted black	Three units	Nasher Sculpture Center			Dallas	TX	Public
	One-Two-Three (3/3)	1976	3/3	Steel, painted black	Three units	Private collection					Private
	One-Two-Three	1976	1/1	Steel, painted black	Three units	Securian Financial Group (Minnesota Mutual Life)			St. Paul	MN	Public
	Throwback (1/3)	1976–77	1/3	Aluminum, painted black	6'8" × 16'2-1/4" × 8'9-1/2"	City of New York	1166 Avenue of the Americas	40°45′23.65″N 73°58′53.84″W	New York	NY	Public
	Throwback (2/3)	1976–77	2/3	Aluminum, painted black	6'8" × 16'2-1/4" × 8'9-1/2"	San Francisco Museum of Modern Art	On view in the Rooftop Garden	37°47′10.72″N 122°24′1.25″W	San Francisco	CA	Public
	Throwback (3/3)	1976–77	3/3	Aluminum, painted black	6'8" × 16'2-1/4" × 8'9-1/2"	Hirshhorn Museum and Sculpture Garden	Currently on view in Hirshhorn Plaza	38°53′17.43″N 77°1′20.75″W	Washington	DC	Public
	Last	1979	1/1	Steel, painted orange-red	35' × 75'	State of Ohio	Frank J. Lausche State Office Building	41°29′51.73″N 81°41′48.66″W	Cleveland	OH	Public
	Untitled (Atlanta) (1/6)	1980	1/6	Cast bronze, black patina	48" x 31" x 24"	Tony Smith Estate					Private
