= Moses (2/3) =

Sculpture by Tony Smith in Seattle, Washington, U.S.

- The sculpture in 2023
- Artist: Tony Smith
- Location: Seattle, Washington, U.S.
- 47°37′14.8″N 122°20′56″W

Moses (2/3) is an abstract steel sculpture which uses multifaceted black steel surfaces crafted by Tony Smith. The artworks name is derived from Michelangelo's Moses. The piece is installed in Seattle Center, in the U.S. state of Washington. The abstract sculpture weighs 5,500 lbs. It was the first major art acquisition under the city's 1% for Art program.

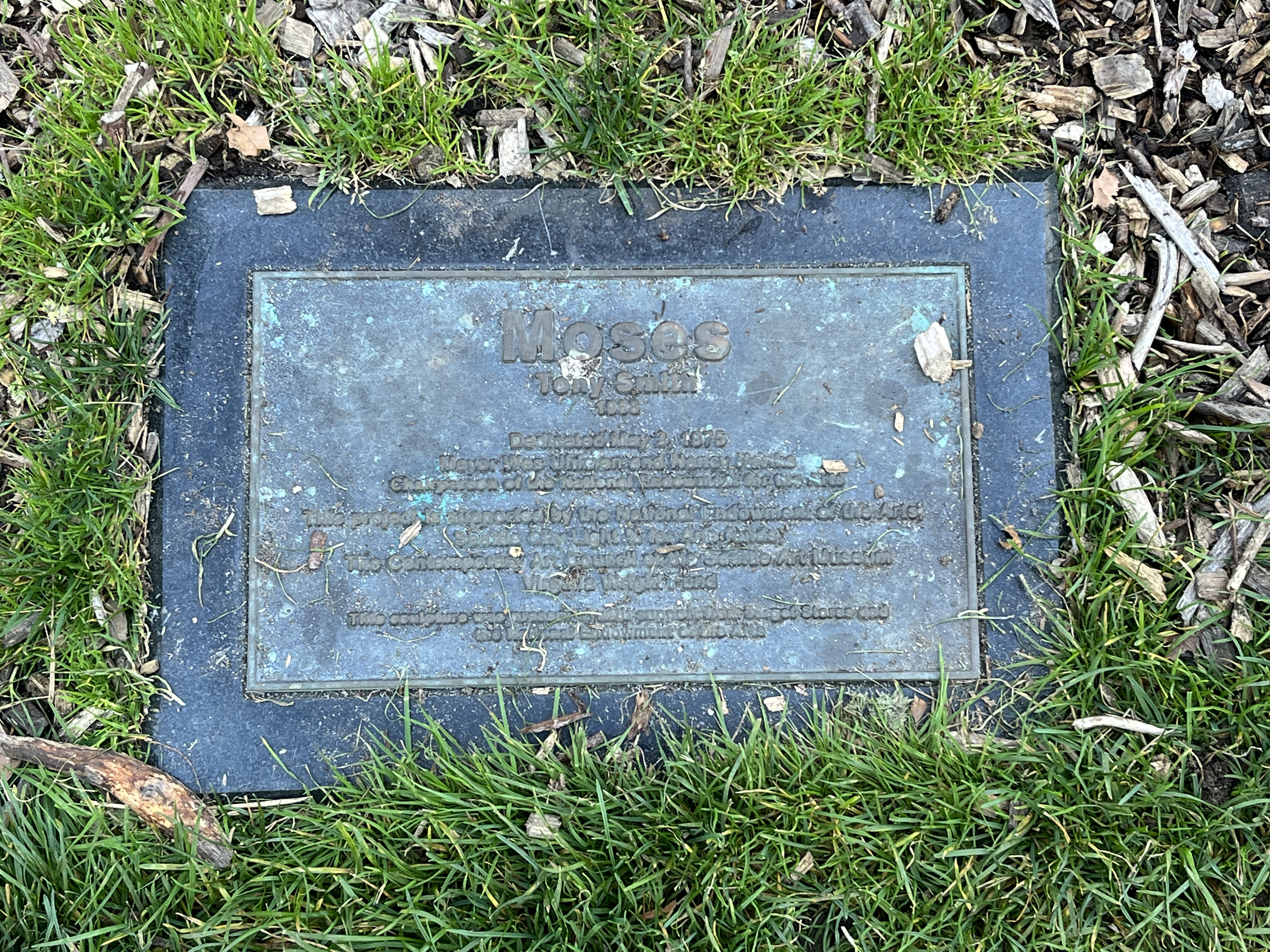
Plaque

== See also ==
- List of sculptures by Tony Smith
