= Artist's proof =

Print not counted in the number of a limited edition

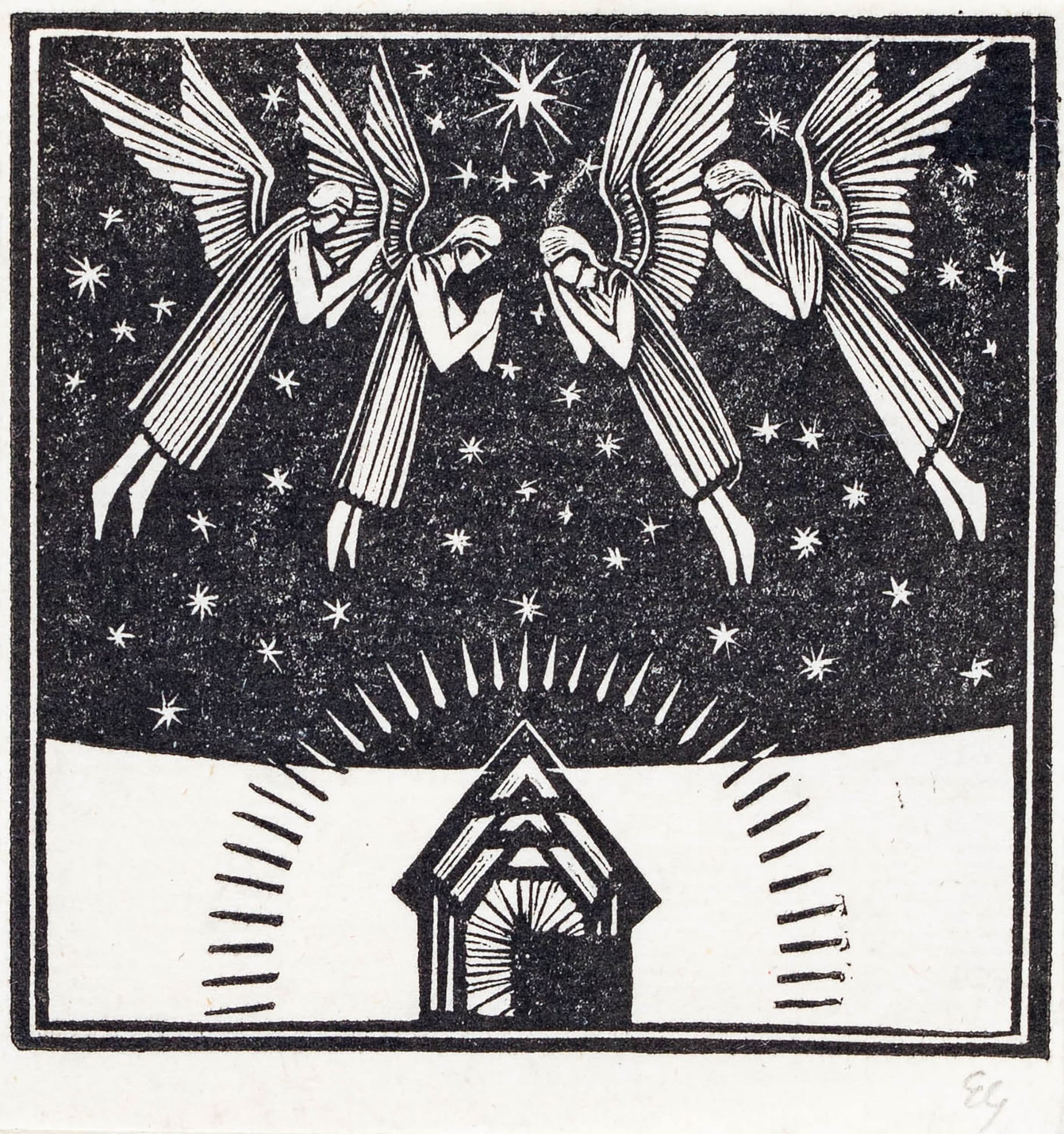
Eric Gill's proof of Cantet Nunc Lo (1916)

An artist's proof is an impression (copy) of a limited edition print that is reserved for the artist and not counted in the edition number. It is usually pencilled as "A/P" to indicate this. By convention they are not usually more than 10% of the main edition quantity.

A "working proof" or "trial proof" is an impression of a print taken in the printmaking process to see the current printing state of a plate while the plate (or stone, or woodblock) is being worked on by the artist. A proof may show a clearly incomplete image, often called a working proof or trial impression, but in modern practice is usually used to describe an impression of the finished work that is identical to the numbered copies. There can also be printer's proofs which are taken for the printer to see how the image is printing, or are final impressions the printer is allowed to keep; these are usually marked "P/P".

Artist's proofs are not included in the count of a limited edition, and sometimes the number of artist's proofs, which belong to the artist, can be twenty or more. By convention, the artist is not supposed to sell these at once. However, some artists use it as a method of re-issuing an edition that has sold out, marking such editions for example 'Artist's Proof no.8 of 50.'

== History ==
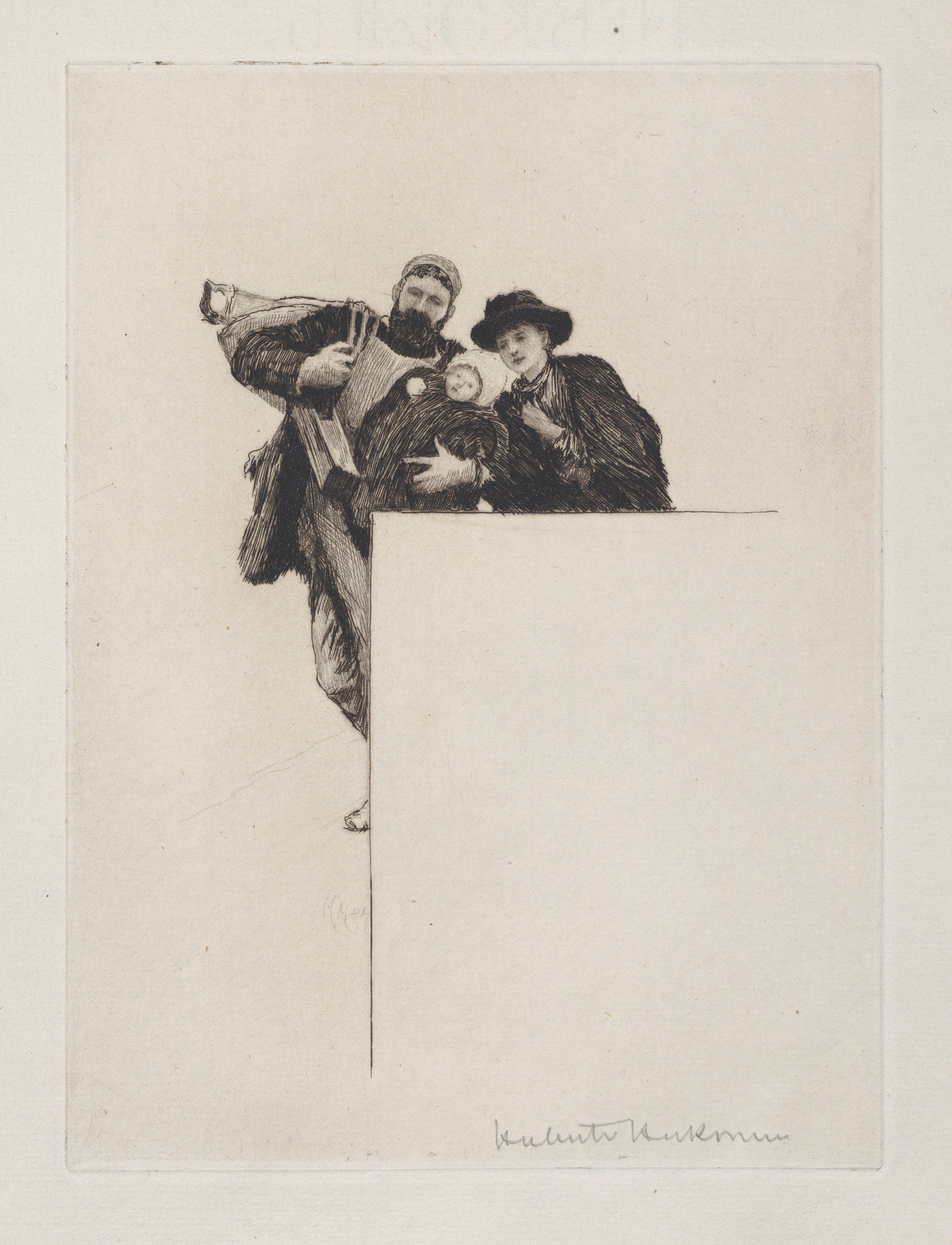
A proof of an etching by Hubert von Herkomer, without text, which would appear in the empty rectangular portion of the page above the artist's signature.

The term "proof" is generally, but not consistently, applied only to prints from the late eighteenth-century onwards, beginning with the English mezzotinters, who began the practice of issuing small editions of proofs for collectors, often before the "lettering" or inscription below the image was added. The practices of signing or numbering impressions in the main edition had not begun, and in the absence of this, it is normally only when the image is clearly different from the final form that the term proof has any meaning.

In old master prints, a proof will be described as belonging to a different state of the print. States are numbered I, II, III etc., in the sequence they were produced, which can normally be determined.

For example, Rembrandt, who had his own printing-press and printed at least the earliest copies of his etchings himself, was a great taker of proofs, but these are normally described as different states - his record was nine for one etching, although this involved returning to an older print he had sold many copies of, and largely reworking it.

But the term proof can be used in the case of a clear working proof of an old master print, like the two impressions of Albrecht Dürer's Adam and Eve (1504, British Museum and Albertina, Vienna) which show the figures largely finished but the background with only the main outlines lightly done.

== Status ==
Art historians, curators, and collectors view working proofs as especially desirable because of their rarity, the insight they may give into the progress of the work, and because they may well have belonged to the artist. Especially in the case of dead artists, they can be the only evidence of the artist's incremental development of an image, something not usually available with drawings, paintings, or sculpture. Some lithographs may be hand signed in the border and labeled "Epreuve D'Artiste", which means Artist's Proof, which also increases its value.

Collectors also usually prefer final artist's proofs even when they are identical to the main edition; if nothing else the print may have been presented to a friend by the artist. Prints are generally sold as limited editions, with a print being cheaper than a drawing or painting because the artist/gallery makes more money by selling multiples. An artist's proof has special value because of its extra rarity and its possible differences from the "standard" print, factors that are often reflected in its price.

== Printshop technicians ==
Since many printmaking processes require expensive equipment, most artists choose to work with specialist printers. The print shop provides technicians skilled in the process; the artist provides the art. It is customary in these cases to pay the technicians with a signed artist's proof, in addition to his wages. The print shop will also retain a proof, normally signed off as "bon à tirer" ("good for printing" in French) to use as a control example against which the other impressions are compared. This has resulted in some very impressive collections of prints owned by printmakers themselves.

An artist's proof is also known as a "comp" or "complimentary" if given to printers.

== See also ==
- Old master print
- Ozalid
- Prepress proofing
