= Tony Smith (sculptor) =

American artist (1912–1980)

- Tony Smith with his sculpture The Snake Is Out in Bryant Park in 1967
- Born: Anthony Peter Smith; September 23, 1912; South Orange, New Jersey
- Died: December 26, 1980 (aged 68)
- Known for: Sculpture, visual arts
- Spouse: Jane Lawrence
- Children: 3, including Kiki Smith and Seton Smith
- Website: www.tonysmithestate.com

Anthony Peter Smith (September 23, 1912 – December 26, 1980) was an American sculptor, painter, architectural designer, and a noted art theorist. As a leading sculptor in the 1960s and 1970s, Smith is often associated with the minimalist art movement.

== Education and early life ==
Smith was born in South Orange, New Jersey, to a waterworks manufacturing family started by his grandfather and namesake, A. P. Smith. Tony contracted tuberculosis around 1916, which lasted through much of elementary school. In an effort to speed his recovery, protect his immune system, and protect his siblings, his family constructed a one-room prefabricated house in the backyard. He had a full-time nurse and had tutors to keep up with his school work; he sporadically attended Sacred Heart Elementary School in Newark, New Jersey. His medicine came in little boxes which he used to form cardboard constructions. Sometimes he visited the waterworks factory, marveling at the industrial production, machines and fabrication processes.

Smith commuted to St. Francis Xavier High School, a Jesuit high school in New York City. In the spring and summer of 1931 he attended Fordham University, and in the fall enrolled at Georgetown University. Smith was disillusioned with formal education, and returned to New Jersey in January 1932, where, during the Great Depression, he opened a second-hand bookstore in Newark on Broad Street. From 1934 to 1936, he worked days at the family factory and attended evening courses at the Art Students League of New York where he studied anatomy with George Bridgman, drawing and watercolor with George Grosz, and painting with Vaclav Vytlacil. In 1937, he moved to Chicago intending to study architecture at the New Bauhaus, where he readily absorbed the interdisciplinary curriculum but was ultimately disillusioned. The following year, Smith began working for Frank Lloyd Wright's Ardmore Project near Philadelphia, Pennsylvania, where he began as a carpenter helper and bricklayer. After a brief period with Wright in Taliesin in Spring Green, Wisconsin, Smith worked building the Armstrong House in Ogden Dunes, Indiana. This period ended when his mother fell ill in 1940 and Smith returned to New Jersey.

== Career ==
Light Up, 1974, outside the Hillman Library at the University of Pittsburgh

In 1940, Smith began his career as an independent architectural designer, which lasted until the early 1960s. He built approximately twenty private homes and envisioned many unrealized projects, such as the 1950 Model Roman Catholic Church, with paintings on glass by Jackson Pollock (1950). His work included homes for many in the art community, including Fritz Bultman (1945), Theodoros Stamos, Fred Olsen (1951), and Betty Parsons (1959-60). Despite these successes, the architect-client relationship frustrated Smith enough that he gravitated toward his own artwork.

Smith returned to the East Coast after two years in Hollywood, California (1943–45) and began teaching while developing architectural projects at the same time as developing various theoretical ideas about painting abstractly. He became a central member of the New York School community, with ties ranging from Gerome Kamrowski to Jackson Pollock, Barnett Newman and Mark Rothko.

He lived in Germany and traveled extensively in Europe from 1953 to 1955, accompanying his wife Jane who was there as an opera singer. There he developed a new group of architectural projects and painted extensively, including the landmark group of Louisenberg paintings (1953–1955). Chiara "Kiki" Smith was born in 1954, when they were living in Nuremberg. Twins Beatrice (Bebe) and Seton were born after the family returned to South Orange, in 1955.

Smith taught architecture and design-related classes at the Delahanty Institute (1956–57) and Pratt Institute (1957–1959), where he developed Throne (1956). This critical early work developed from a class assignment for students at Pratt to determine the simplest possible three-dimensional joint that could be stacked for more than two levels. Smith enhanced the geometrical solution of four triangular prisms by adding another joint, resulting in a new form with seven triangular prisms enclosing two tetrahedra. After some time passed, he decided that the resulting form was something other than a design exercise, so he titled it Throne.

Smith then joined the faculty at Bennington College in Vermont. In 1960 a class project investigating close-packed cells based on D'Arcy Wentworth Thompson's book Growth & Form (1918) sparked Smith's search for artistic inspiration in the natural world. The resulting agglomeration of 14-sided tetrakaidecahedrons, the ideally efficient soap-bubble cell, is known as the Bennington Structure. This was the first time Smith saw the impact that enlarged geometric shapes could have as independent but architecturally scaled forms - as sculpture. While recovering from an automobile accident at home in 1961, Smith started to create small sculptural maquettes using agglomerations of tetrahedrons and octahedrons. By 1962 he was teaching at Hunter College. In this year he created Black Box, his first fabricated steel sculpture. The dense rectangular prism, less than two feet high, developed from a mundane object, a 3 x 5" file card box that Smith saw on the desk of American Art critic and historian Eugene Goosen, his colleague and friend. Smith enlarged the proportions of the box five times, like a recent class assignment. He phoned a local fabricator, Industrial Welding, whose billboard he had seen while driving on the New Jersey Turnpike and asked them to deliver it to his suburban home. Although the welders assumed he was crazed, they treated the project with the utmost workmanship and the result was a stunning form to Smith. With this piece, entitled Black Box, Smith had discovered a sculpting process that he continued to hone. Where others saw a pure geometric shape, Smith saw it as a mysterious form. The title alluded to the corrupt administration of New York mayor Jimmy Walker (1926–32), when contractors would drop bribes into a slot in a "black" box. Black Box was set on the site of the black wood-burning stove in the little house he had lived in as a small child, so it functioned as a kind of gravestone. It was deliberately placed on a thin base of two-by-four inch plywood pieces to call attention to its status as a work of art.

In 1962, he made Die, a 6' steel cube that established his reputation as one of the most influential and important artists of his time. The Elevens Are Up (1963) follows formally on Die. Inspired by the two veins on the back of the neck which are accentuated when one has had too much to drink, the sculpture consists of two black steel masses installed face to face, four feet apart. Fabricated in steel and weighing over 12,000 pounds, the later Source (1967) is a monumental sculpture which Smith first exhibited at documenta IV in Kassel, Germany in the summer of 1968. After exhibiting massive, black-painted plywood and metal works at several sites across the United States and internationally, Smith was featured on the October 13, 1967 cover of Time with his plywood structure Smoke (1967) enveloping the atrium of the Corcoran Gallery of Art in Washington.

Allied with the minimalist school, Smith worked with simple geometrical modules combined on a three-dimensional grid, creating drama through simplicity and scale. During the 1940s and 1950s Smith became close friends with Barnett Newman, Jackson Pollock, Mark Rothko, and Clyfford Still. His sculpture shows their abstract influence. One of Smith's unrealized architectural projects in 1950 was a plan for a church that was to have painted glass panels designed in collaboration with his friend Pollock.

Smith also taught at various institutions including New York University, Cooper Union, Pratt Institute, Bennington College, and Hunter College, where he mentored artists such as Pat Lipsky.

Smith was asked to teach a sculpture course at the University of Hawaiʻi at Mānoa during the summer of 1969. He designed two unrealized works, Haole Crater (a recessed garden) and Hubris, but eventually created The Fourth Sign that was sited on the campus. His Hawaii experience also generated fodder for his "For..." series whose initials are friends and artists he met during his time in Mānoa.

In 2024, Massachusetts Institute of Technology Press published the Tony Smith Catalogue Raisonné Volume 1 Sculpture and Volume 2 Architecture both edited by James Voorhies and Sarah Auld.

== Exhibitions ==
The Fourth Sign, 1977, at the University of Hawaiʻi at Mānoa

Smith's first exhibitions were in 1964, and he had his first one-person exhibition in 1966. That same year, was asked to anchor the seminal 1966 show at the Jewish Museum in New York entitled Primary Structures, one of the most important exhibitions of the 1960s. Smith's museum debut as a sculptor of large-scale, geometric sculpture was at the Wadsworth Atheneum, Hartford, Connecticut, and the Institute of Contemporary Art, University of Pennsylvania, Philadelphia (1966), followed by a nationwide traveling exhibition that began at the Andrew Dickson White House, Cornell University in Ithaca, New York (1968), and a New Jersey–based traveling show organized by the Newark Museum and New Jersey State Council on the Arts (1970).

A major retrospective, "Tony Smith: Architect, Painter, Sculptor," was held at the Museum of Modern Art in New York in 1998, including his architecture, painting, and sculpture. A European retrospective followed in 2002, arranged by the Institut Valencià d'Art Modern, Spain and the Menil Collection, Houston, organized a retrospective of Smith's works on paper in 2010. Smith was also included in a Guggenheim International Exhibition, New York (1967); the Venice Biennale (1968); documenta 4, Kassel, Germany (1968); Whitney Annual, Whitney Museum of American Art, New York (1966, 1970, and 1971); and Whitney Biennial, New York (1973).

September 23, 2012 marked the one hundredth anniversary of Smith's birth. Institutions around the world celebrated his centennial with special events, including a daylong symposium at the National Gallery of Art, a panel discussion at the Seattle Art Museum, an outdoor sculpture installation at Bryant Park in New York, and the exhibition "Kiki Smith, Seton Smith, Tony Smith: A Family of Artists", which opened at the Kunsthalle Bielefeld, Germany, that day.

== Collections ==
Smith's work is included in most leading international public collections, including the Museum of Modern Art, New York; Menil Collection, Houston; the Governor Nelson A. Rockefeller Empire State Plaza Art Collection, Albany, NY; Walker Art Center, Minneapolis; Louisiana Museum of Modern Art, Humlebæk, Denmark; and the Kröller-Müller Museum, Otterlo, the Netherlands. In 2003, the National Gallery of Art in Washington acquired one of four casts of Smith's first steel sculpture, Die, created in 1962 and fabricated in 1968, from Paula Cooper Gallery.

Smoke (1967) currently fills the 60-foot high atrium leading into the Los Angeles County Museum of Art's Ahmanson Building; the museum purchased the work in 2010.

The estate of Tony Smith is currently represented by Pace Gallery in New York.

== Private life ==
Smith met his wife, opera singer and actress Jane Lawrence, in New York in 1943. They moved to Los Angeles and were married in Santa Monica, with Tennessee Williams as the only witness.

He was the father of artists Chiara "Kiki" Smith, Seton Smith, and the underground actress Beatrice "Bebe" Smith (Seton's twin, who died in 1988).

In 1961, Smith was injured in a car accident and subsequently developed polycythemia, a blood condition which produces a large number of red blood cells. His health was always in question and deteriorated until he succumbed to a heart attack at age 68 on December 26, 1980. At the time of his death, he and his family resided in South Orange, New Jersey.

== See also ==
- Environmental sculpture
- List of sculptures by Tony Smith
- The Tony Smith Artist Research Project
