= List of breweries in Washington (state) =

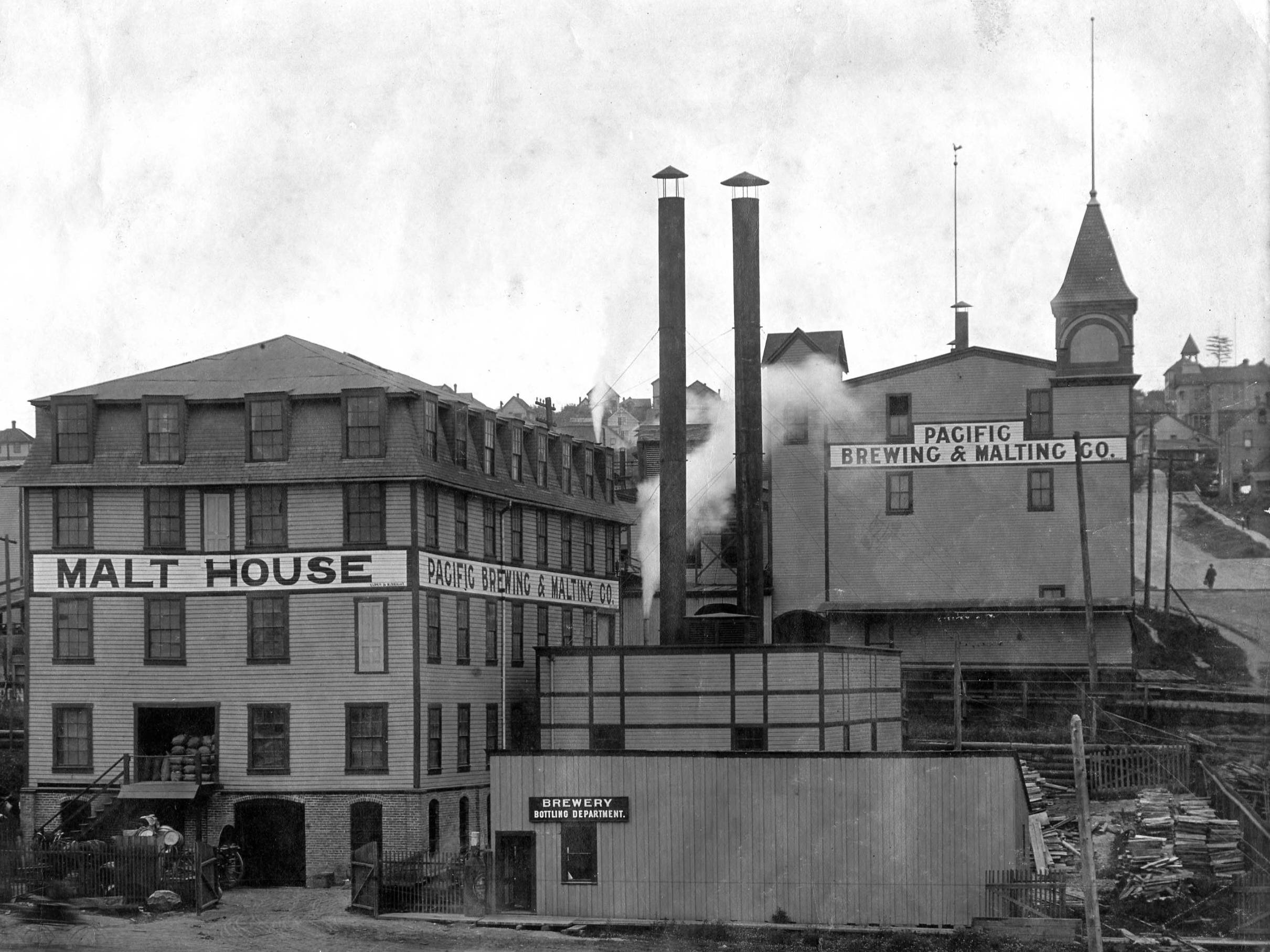
The Pacific Brewing & Malting Company in Tacoma, circa 1900

This is a list of breweries in the U.S. state of Washington.

In 2012, Washington ranked 8th nationally in craft breweries per capita. In 2014, there were 281 breweries licensed by the Washington State Liquor Control Board (WSLCB), 233 of which produced at least one barrel of beer. In 2016, there were 337 breweries in Washington, including 174 in the Seattle area, which was more than in any other metropolitan area. In 2022, Washington ranked 4th in the list of states with the most craft breweries, following California, Pennsylvania, and New York. In 2023, the Washington Brewers Guild listed 426 breweries throughout the state.

The first American brewpub since Prohibition, Yakima Brewing & Malting Co, was based in Washington.

== Breweries ==
| Brewery | Location | Notes |
|---|---|---|
| 7 Seas Brewing Company | Gig Harbor, Tacoma | Opened in 2009 |
| Aslan Brewing Company | Bellingham | Opened in 2014 |
| Bale Breaker Brewing Company | Yakima | Opened in 2013 |
| Black Raven Brewing Company | Redmond | Opened in 2009 |
| Boundary Bay Brewing Company | Bellingham | Opened in 1995 |
| Diamond Knot Craft Brewing | Mukilteo, Mountlake Terrace | Opened in 1994 |
| Dick's Brewing Company | Centralia | Opened in 1994 |
| Distant West Brewing | Seattle | Opened in 2024 |
| Elliott Bay Brewing Company | Seattle, Burien | Opened in 1997 |
| Elysian Brewing Company | Seattle (3) | Opened in 1996; owned by AB InBev |
| Fremont Brewing | Seattle | Opened in 2009 |
| Georgetown Brewing Company | Seattle | Opened in 2002 |
| Hemlock State Brewing Company | Mountlake Terrace | Opened in 2019 |
| Ice Harbor Brewing Company | Kennewick | Opened in 1996 |
| Iron Goat Brewery | Spokane | Founded in 2011 |
| Iron Horse Brewery | Ellensburg | Opened in 2004 |
| Kulshan Brewing Company | Bellingham (3) | Opened in 2012 |
| Lumberbeard Brewery | Spokane | Opened in 2022 |
| Mac & Jack's Brewing Company | Redmond | Opened in 1997 |
| Maritime Pacific Brewing Company | Seattle | Opened in 1990 |
| Matchless Brewing | Tumwater | Opened in 2017 |
| McMenamins | various locations | McMenamins operates a number of breweries, restaurants, and other businesses; their first brewery opened in 1985. |
| Narrows Brewing | Tacoma | Opened in 2013 |
| No-Li Brewhouse | Spokane | Opened in Airway Heights, Washington as Northern Lights Brewery in 1993; moved to Spokane in 2002; renamed No-Li Brewhouse in 2012 |
| North Fork Brewery | Deming | Opened in 1997 |
| Old Stove Brewing | Seattle | Opened in 2016 |
| Paradise Creek Brewery | Pullman | Opened in the Old Post Office in 2010 |
| Pike Brewing Company | Seattle | Opened in 1989 |
| Postdoc Brewing | Redmond | Opened in 2014 |
| Ram Restaurant & Brewery | various locations | Chain of brewpubs that started in Salem, Oregon in 1995 |
| Redhook Ale Brewery | Woodinville | Opened in 1981; owned by Tilray |
| Reuben's Brews | Seattle | Opened in 2012 |
| Salish Sea Brewing | Edmonds | Opened in 2013 |
| Scuttlebutt Brewing Company | Everett | Opened in 1996 |
| Silver City Brewery | Bremerton | Opened in 1996 |
| Snoqualmie Falls Brewery | Snoqualmie | Opened in 1997 |
| Stoup Brewing | Seattle (3) | Opened in 2013 |
| Two Beers Brewing Company | Seattle | Opened in 2007; acquired by Agrial Group in 2016 |
| Uprise Brewing | Spokane | Opened in 2022 |

== Closed breweries ==
| Brewery | Location | Notes |
|---|---|---|
| Airways Brewing Company | Kent | Opened in 2011, closed in 2024 |
| American Brewing Company | Edmonds | Opened in 2011, closed in 2020 |
| Big Al Brewing | Seattle | Opened in 2008, closed in 2017 |
| Fish Brewing Company | Olympia | Opened in 1993, closed in 2023 |
| Gordon Biersch Brewing Company | Seattle | Chain of brewpubs founded in Palo Alto, California in 1988 and owned by SPB Hospitality; the Seattle location opened in 1998 and closed in 2019 |
| Hale's Ales | Seattle | Opened in 1983, closed in 2022 |
| Harmon Brewing Co. | Tacoma (2) | Opened in 1997, ceased brewing in 2019 |
| Hilliard's Beer | Seattle | Opened in 2010, closed in 2016 |
| Optimism Brewing Company | Seattle | Opened in 2013, closed in 2023 |
| Pyramid Breweries | Seattle | Founded in Kalama as Hart Brewing in 1984; renamed Pyramid Breweries and moved to Seattle in 1996; acquired by North American Breweries in 2010; closed in 2020. |
| Rainier Brewing Company | Seattle | Opened in 1884, acquired by Stroh Brewery Company in 1996, closed in 1999 |
| Rock Bottom Brewery | Bellevue | Chain of brewpubs founded in Denver, Colorado in 1991 and owned by SPB Hospitality; the Bellevue location opened in 1999 and closed in 2015 |
| Sound Brewery | Poulsbo | Opened in 2011, closed in 2019 |
| Weinhard Brewing Company | Seattle | Makers of Henry Weinhard's and other brands; opened in 1864, closed in 1999 |
| Yakima Brewing | Yakima | Opened in 1982, closed in 2004 |

== See also ==
- Beer in the United States
- List of breweries in the United States
- List of microbreweries
