= Lady Rainier =

Statue in Seattle, Washington, U.S.

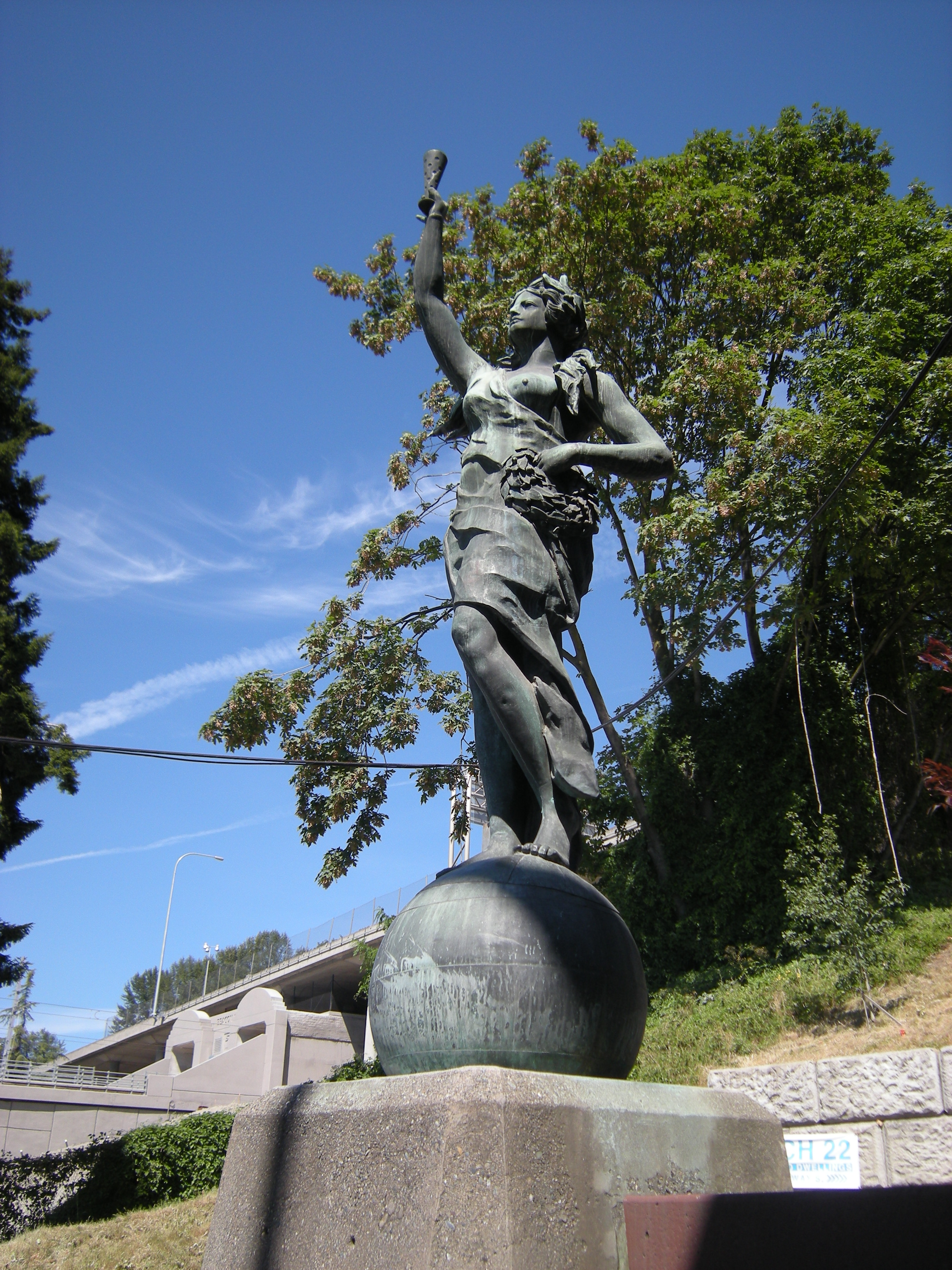
- The statue in 2009
- 47°34′36.5″N 122°19′13.5″W
- Location: 3100 Airport Way, Seattle, Washington, United States
- Type: Statue
- Material: Bronzed
- Height: 10 feet (3.0 m)
- Completion date: 1903

Lady Rainier is a public sculpture in Seattle, Washington, United States. The work, consisting of a bronzed statue of a woman holding a glass, was commissioned by the Seattle Brewing & Malting Company (the producers of Rainier Beer) and created in Germany in 1903. It was designed as part of a fountain, with water overflowing from the cup, resembling beer foam. Upon completion, it was placed in a courtyard outside of their facilities in the city's Georgetown neighborhood. Over the next several years, it was relocated multiple times and is today located outside of a former Rainier brewery in Seattle's SoDo neighborhood. In 2005, activists in Georgetown proposed relocating the statue to Oxbow Park and restoring it as an active fountain. As of 2019, the relocation had not occurred.

== Design ==
The bronzed statue stands 10 feet (3.0 m) tall and depicts a woman with an outstretched arm holding a glass. As a fountain, the water would have poured out from the cup, resembling beer foam spilling from a glass. The statue currently stands near the north entrance of the old Rainier brewery in SoDo, near Interstate 5 at 3100 Airport Way.

== History ==
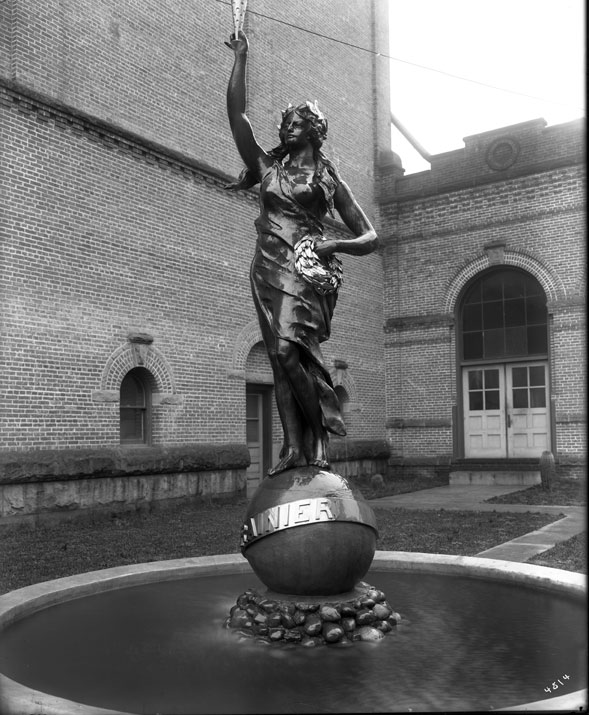
1904 Image of Lady Rainier by Asahel Curtis

The statue was crafted in Germany and purchased by the Seattle Brewing & Malting Company, the manufacturers of Rainier Beer, who installed it as a fountain in a courtyard in front of their brewery in Georgetown in 1903. In 1904, the statue was featured in an article on the brewery by The Seattle Times, with the newspaper saying that the art piece was "made especially for the Rainier Brewery and imported from Germany (and) is a work of art and would grace any of the city’s parks". In 1912, the brewery was expanded and a machine shop was built on the courtyard, with the company relocating the statue to the top of the building. Over the next several years, the statue was relocated several times, and in 1916, the fountain element was turned off as the company closed due to the enactment of Prohibition in Washington. In the 1930s, following the repeal of Prohibition, production of Rainier Beer resumed at a new location in SoDo. In 1954, the statue was also relocated to this new facility, located 2 miles (3.2 km) north of the old facility. In 1999, this facility was sold by the Stroh Brewery Company (which had acquired the Rainier brand), who donated the statue to the Museum of History & Industry. In the early 2000s, the facility ceased to be an active brewery and began to lease its space to other businesses, including Tully's Coffee, which uses the space as its headquarters. A similar situation occurred with the Georgetown facility, which is also no longer an active Rainier brewery.

In 2005, activists and members of the Georgetown Community Council announced plans to relocate the statue to Oxbow Park in Georgetown, near the Hat 'n' Boots, which was also relocated. The park had been dedicated earlier that year and was planned with the sculpture in mind, with a patch of land set aside to host the piece. Additionally, they planned to restore the piece as a working fountain, with the total cost estimated at $30,000. However the planned relocation has not come to fruition, with The Seattle Times reporting in 2019 that the sculpture was still standing near the old Rainier brewery.
