= Georgetown Brewing Company =

Brewery in Georgetown neighborhood of Seattle, Washington

Coordinates: 47.555134°N 122.325957°W

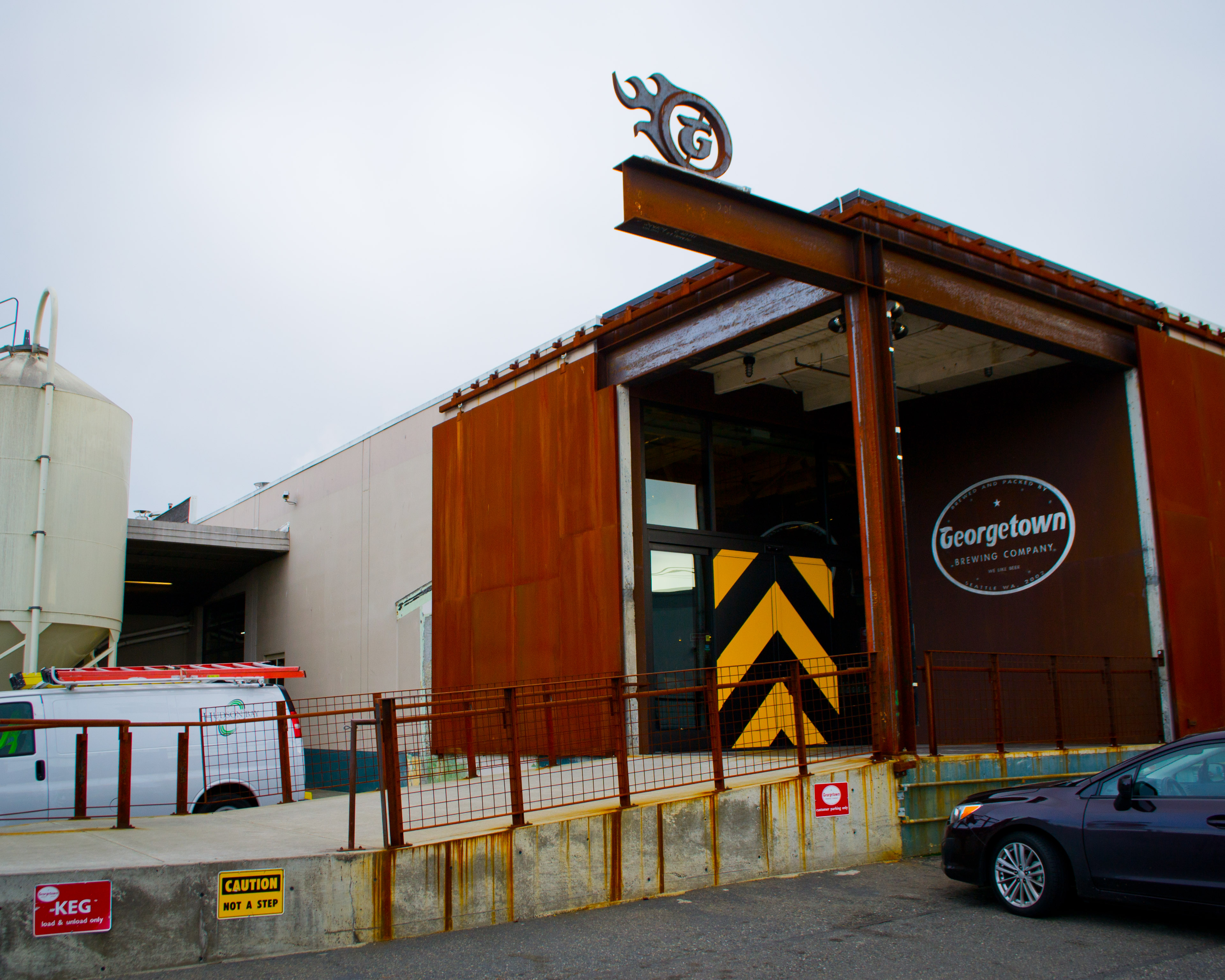
- The entrance to Georgetown Brewing Company.
- Industry: Alcoholic beverage
- Founded: 2002
- Products: Beer

Georgetown Brewing Company is a brewery in Seattle's Georgetown neighborhood, USA. It originally sold only draft beer and for a time was the largest draft-only brewery in the United States. In May 2017 Georgetown began to offer its Bodhizafa IPA, Lucille IPA, and Roger's Pilsner in 12 oz. cans. The primary brew is a pale ale called Manny's.

== History ==
The brewery was founded in 2002 by Manny Chao and Roger Bialous. Chao was one of the original employees of Mac & Jack's Brewing Company. Georgetown Brewing Company was started with an initial investment of $200,000. Within its first year, the brewery had broken even with 80 restaurant and bar accounts. It was originally located in a space at the historic Seattle Brewing and Malting Plant, where Rainier Beer was once produced. The company relocated to a larger space in 2008 to increase capacity.

== Manny's Pale Ale ==
Manny's Pale Ale was the first beer offered by the brewery. As of April 2011, it accounted for 85% of Georgetown's business and was available in about 500 bars around Seattle. The company's website describes it as a pale ale with a "rich and complex malty middle with a snappy hop finish."

== Point Break-inspired Beers ==
Two full-time beers have naming connections to the 1991 cult-classic film Point Break starring Patrick Swayze as Bodhi and Keanu Reeves as Johnny Utah: IPA Bodhizafa and pale ale Johnny Utah where the product page says, "Get me two!"
