= Paradise Creek =

Paradise Creek can refer to:

- Paradise Creek (Pennsylvania), tributary of Brodhead Creek in the Pocono mountains of the eastern United States
- Paradise Creek, tributary of Lyons River in Western Australia
- Paradise Creek, tributary of Salmond River in the Pentecost River system in Western Australia
- Paradise Creek, tributary of Bow River in Alberta, Canada
- Paradise Creek, tributary of the South Fork of the Palouse River in the northwestern United States
- Paradise Creek, tributary of the Hopkins River on the South Island of New Zealand
- Paradise Creek (horse), racehorse
- Paradise Creek Brewery, located in the Old Post Office in Pullman, Washington
