= List of companies based in Redmond, Washington =

This is a list of companies based in Redmond, Washington, United States. Although Redmond is a metonym for Microsoft, the city's largest employer, it has many other businesses as well.

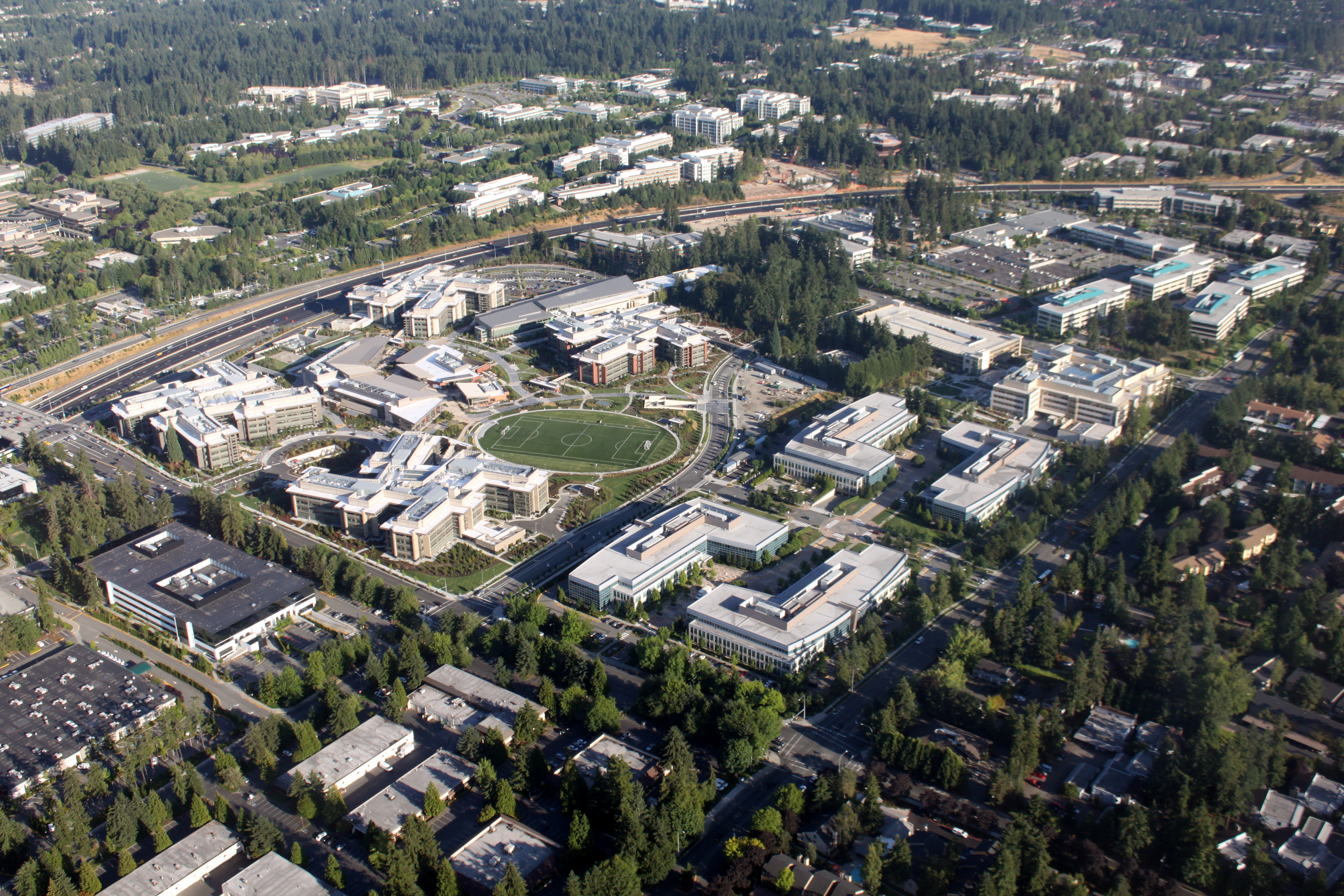
Aerial view of an office parks in Redmond, Washington, August 2009

== Based in Redmond ==
- Amazon.com
  - Amazon Kuiper
- AT&T Wireless
- Data I/O
- Edmark
- HipSoft
- Hyperlite
- Innersloth
- Mac & Jack's Brewing Company
- Microsoft
  - 343 Industries game studio
  - Good Science Studio game studio
  - Launchworks game studio
  - Microsoft Studios game studio
  - Turn 10 Studios
  - Mojang
- Paizo Publishing
- Solstice
- Samsung Semiconductor
- WildTangent

== Major operation in Redmond ==
- AT&T Mobility (formerly Cingular, headquartered in Redmond)
- Genie (subsidiary of Terex since 2002, formerly Genie Industries headquartered in Redmond)
- Hyperloop Genesis
- Nintendo of America (subsidiary of Nintendo)
- Physio-Control (subsidiary of Stryker Corporation)
- Wargaming Seattle (subsidiary of Cyprus-based Wargaming, formerly Gas Powered Games headquartered in Redmond)
- SpaceX (Satellite Development Center)
