= Snoqualmie Falls Brewery =

American beverage manufacturer

Snoqualmie Falls Brewery is a small craft brewing company located near the Snoqualmie Falls, Snoqualmie, Washington.

The company's beers include Bunghole, a double brown ale at 7.7% alcohol by volume and Harvest Moon, a 5.3% ABV German-style festbier. Their products have featured in beer festivals around Washington, including the Oktoberfest in Seattle and the company is one of several beer suppliers to baseball games at the Safeco Field.

== History ==
Founders Pat Anderson, David McKibben, Dave Eiffert, LeRoy Gmazel and Tom Antone started the Snoqualmie Falls Brewery on December 20, 1997. The original beers were formulated by Pat Anderson, and the initial batch of each was brewed by David McKibben, with Pat Anderson assisting. The only original beer that remains today is the Wildcat IPA. Rande Reed who had been the head brewer at Thomas Kemper and Pyramid Brewery joined the team as the head brewer at Snoqualmie Falls Brewing on January 9, 1998. The newest co-owners to join were John and Denise Snow in the summer of 2013.

== Brewing ==
Snoqualmie Falls Brewing Company produced over 4,000 barrels in 2014. There several flavors of beer that Snoqualmie Falls Brewing brews throughout the year. Seasonal and special release beers are also brewed.

== See also ==
- List of breweries in Washington (state)
