= Georgetown Steam Plant =

- Seattle Electric Company Georgetown Steam Plant
- U.S. National Register of Historic Places
- U.S. National Historic Landmark
- Seattle Landmark
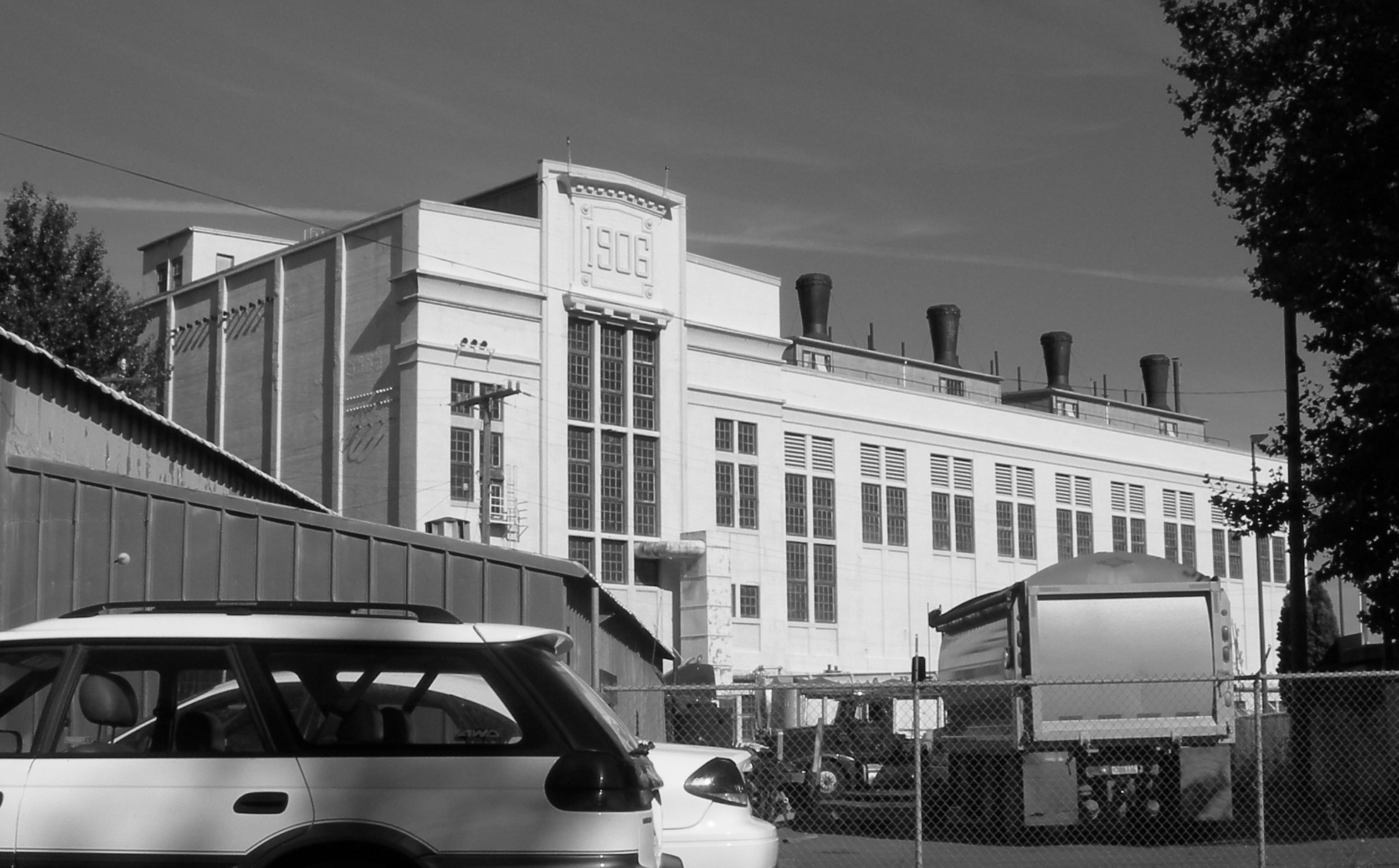
- Location: Seattle, Washington
- Coordinates: 47°32′34.02″N 122°18′57.74″W
- Built: 1906
- Architect: Stone & Webster Engineering; Frank B. Gilbreth
- Architectural style: Classical Revival
- NRHP reference No.: 78002755

Significant dates
- Added to NRHP: August 1, 1978
- Designated NHL: July 5, 1984
- Designated SEATL: September 10, 1984

The Georgetown Steam Plant, located in the Georgetown neighborhood of Seattle, Washington, was constructed in 1906 for the Seattle Electric Company to provide power for Seattle, notably for streetcars.

== History ==
The plant was originally built by Stone and Webster in 1906. One of the first reinforced concrete structures on the U.S. West Coast, it originally provided power for the Interurban Railway between Seattle and Tacoma; it also provided both direct current for Seattle's streetcars and alternating current for Georgetown, then an independent city. They purchased General Electric steam turbine technology, based on patents originally held by inventor Charles Gordon Curtis. At the time, this was cutting-edge technology, and the Georgetown Steam Plant "marks the beginning of the end of the reciprocating steam engine" as the dominant mode of generating electricity on a large scale.

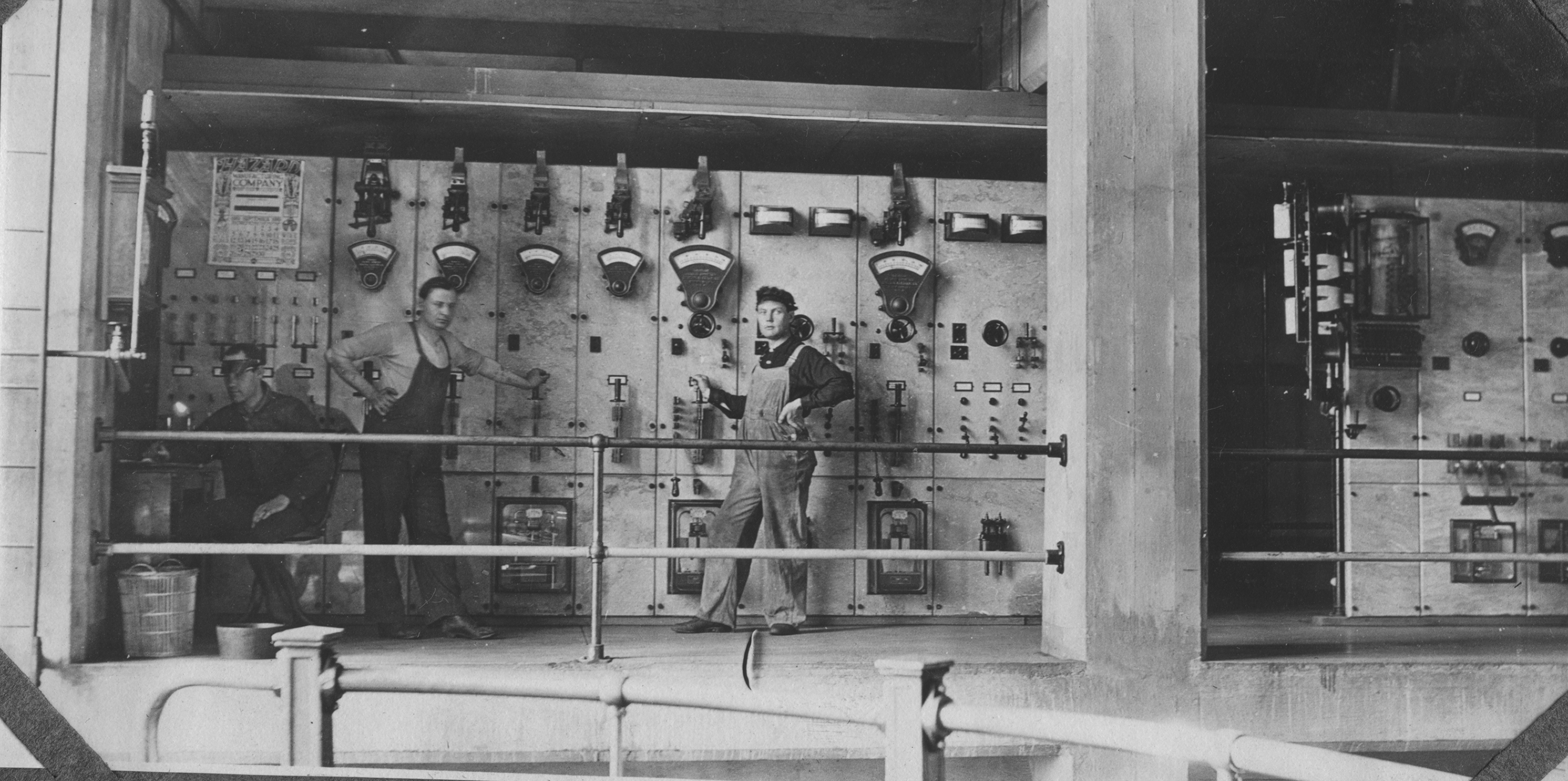
Workers at the plant, 1909

Originally located along an oxbow of the Duwamish River to provide cooling water, the plant was left inland after the original river channel was straightened in 1917. Retired after nearly 75 years of operation, it remains "surprisingly complete and operable". The plant has three Curtis turbines, manufactured by the General Electric Company between 1906 and 1917.

Puget Sound Traction and Lighting Company (now Puget Sound Energy) bought the Seattle Electric Company in 1912; the Georgetown Steam Plant powered the Seattle-to-Tacoma Interurban and Seattle streetcars; it also provided residential and industrial power to Georgetown. Originally an oil-fired plant, it converted to a coal in 1917. As hydropower was developed in the 1910s and 1920s the steam plant became uncompetitive and only used for emergencies. It last produced electricity in January 1953 when water levels at the dams were low. Decommissioning took place in 1972.

== Landmark and museum ==
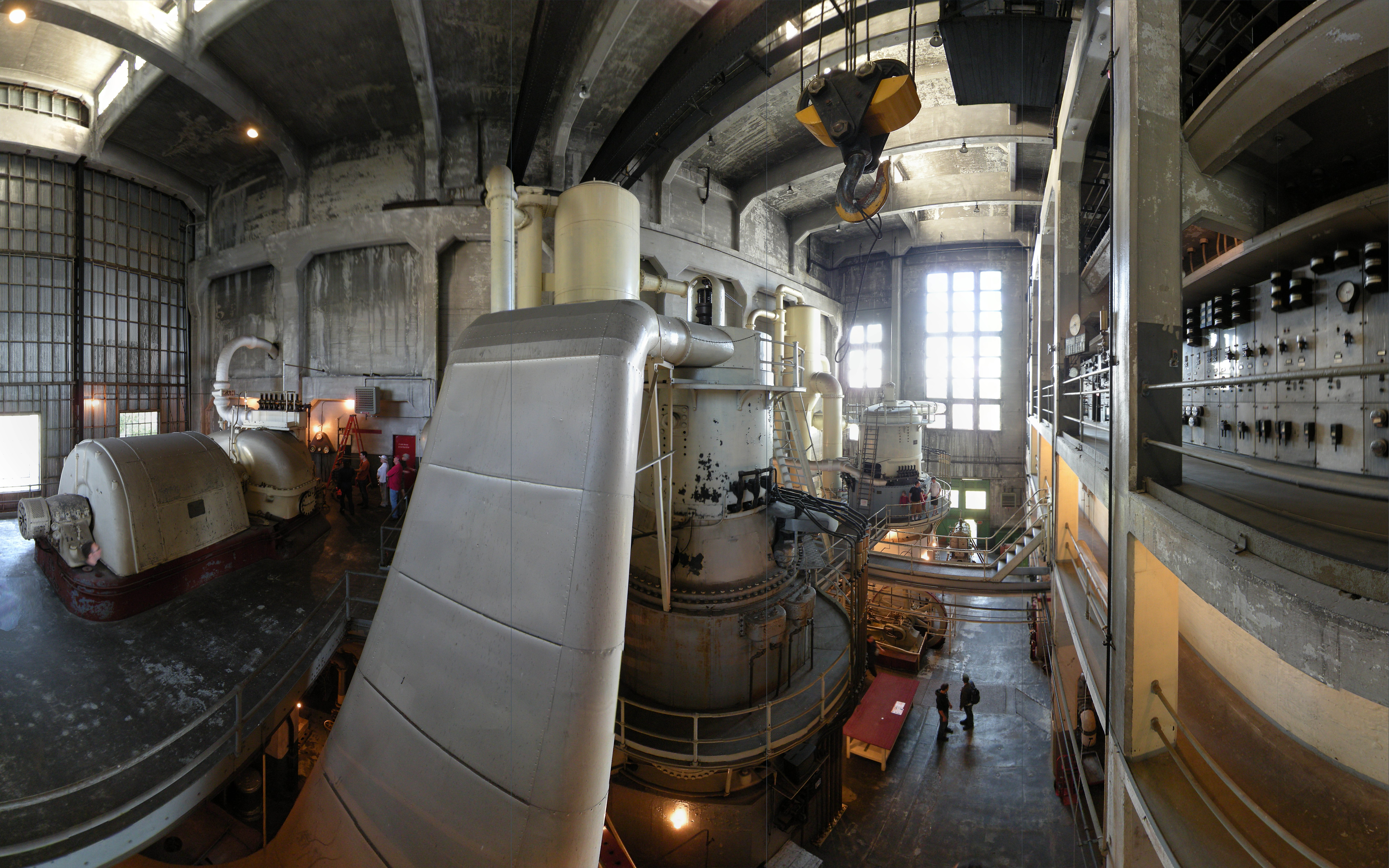
Inside the plant, 2008

The building was declared a National Historic Landmark in 1984, and is also designated by the American Society of Mechanical Engineers as a National Historic Mechanical Engineering Landmark. At the time of its landmarking, it contained the "last operating examples of the world's first large scale, steam turbine". The building itself, "built by a fast-track construction process, was designed and supervised by Frank W. Gilbreth, later a nationally famous proponent of efficiency engineering." The building is also a Seattle City Landmark and is on the Washington State Register of Historic Places.

In 1987, the plant was the site of the last performance of the rock band Big Black.

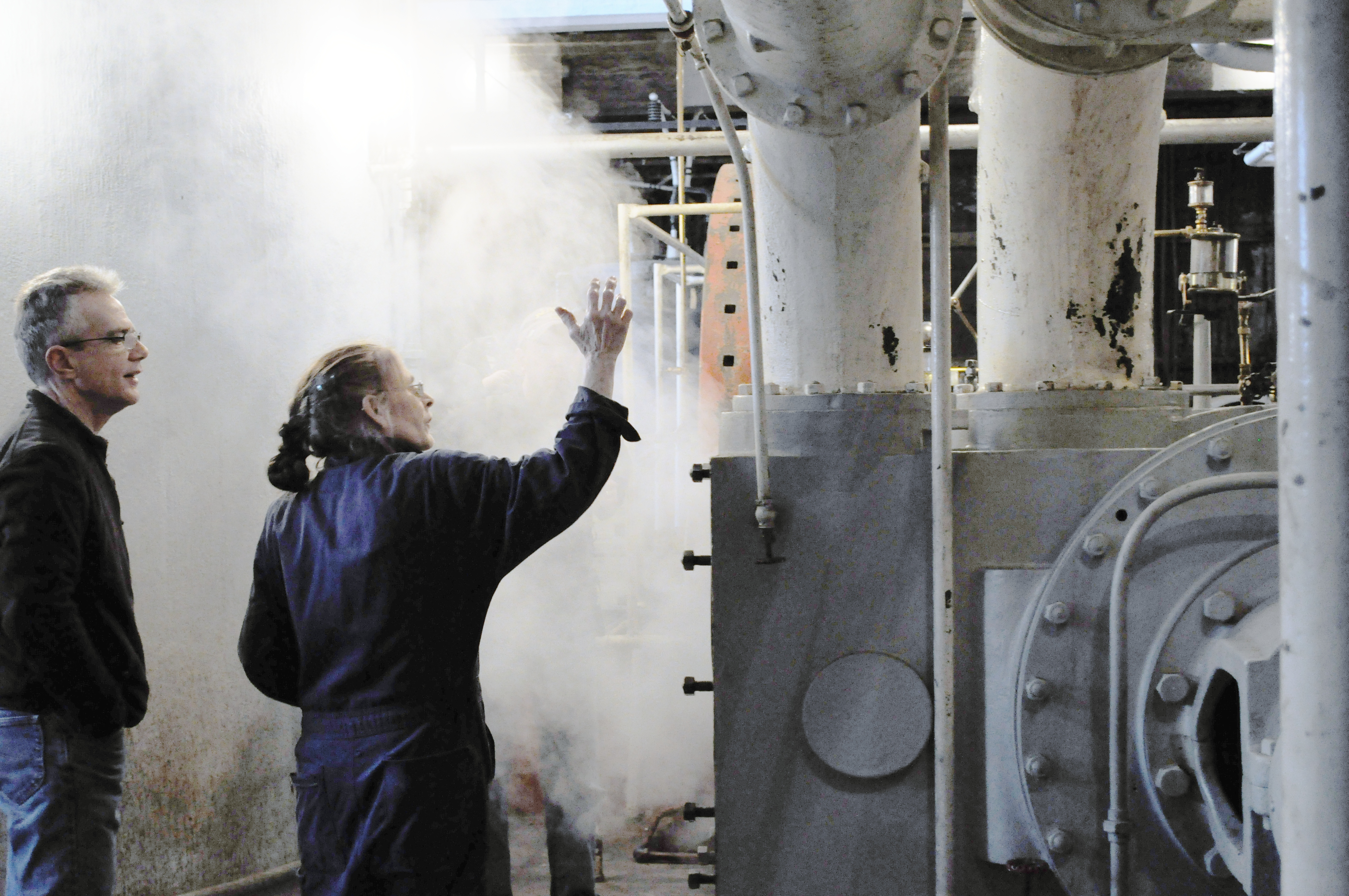
Lilly Tellefson at the plant, 2010

Paul Carosino and Lilly Tellefson founded the Georgetown PowerPlant Museum in 1995 to restore, maintain and operate the plant. However, the next year Carosino died of a heart attack at the age of 48, leaving Tellefson to run it without him. In this era, programs were established to use the facility to teach boiler firemen and steam engineers.

The plant remains owned by Seattle City Light, the city's public electric utility. In 2014, the plant began opening to the general public once a month for open houses.

The plant houses the last operable examples of early vertical Curtis steam generating turbines, as well as operational reciprocating steam engines, a collection of vintage machining tools, and several smaller steam engines.

On July 12, 2021, the City of Seattle passed an ordinance authorizing City Light to execute a long-term lease and operating agreement with the Georgetown Steam Plant Community Development Authority (GSPCDA). The new authority has a mandate to steward the plant, to add amenities, and to establish public programming "for the purposes of historical interpretation as well as education in the areas of science, technology, education, arts, math, and related events." Thereafter, the plant began expanding their scope of events, including visual art and musical exhibitions and workshops. In 2024, the plant hosted their first annual Georgetown Steam Plant Science Fair, a celebration "grounded in SHTEAM: Science, History, Technology, Engineering, Art, and Math."

== Notes ==
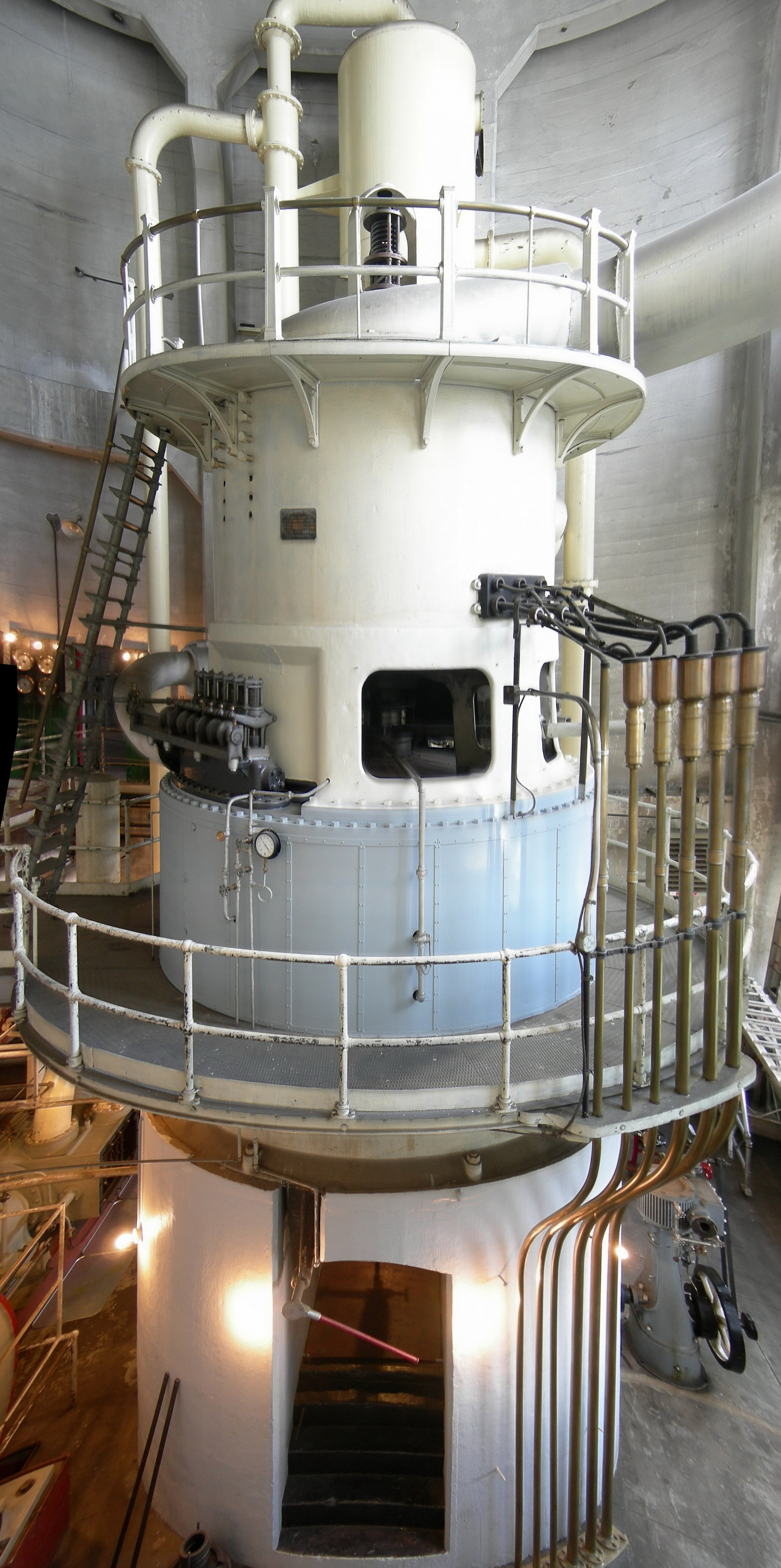
Vertical steam turbine
