= Black Raven Brewing Company =

- Location: United States King County, Washington
- Coordinates: 47°44′35″N 122°09′25″W
- Opened: 2009

Black Raven Brewing Company is a brewery based in the Eastside of King County, Washington. The Redmond, Washington brewery and 34-seat brewpub opened in 2009, and a 100-seat brewpub in Woodinville opened in 2019, along with larger production facility there to enable distribution to Hawaii and other states.

In 2010, The Seattle Times said it may be the state's first cult beer, with frequent sell-outs of taps, and customers waiting outside the Redmond brew pub for opening time in the afternoon. According to CNN, the brewery produced "some of the best brews in the state [of Washington]" in 2015; Thrillist listed them as one of the top 13 in the state in 2015; and three of their brews were rated among the best 30 in Washington state in 2023, according to Beer Advocate.

The brewery won two gold awards and a silver award at the Brewers Association World Beer Cup in 2010, and a gold medal at Washington Beer Awards in 2017. The brewery's Trickster IPA was one of several Washington micro brews selected in an expansion of the beers on tap onboard Washington State Ferries in 2017 to "hyper-local products and iconic beers from around the state".

== See also ==
- List of breweries in Washington (state)
