= Optimism Brewing Company =

Defunct brewery in Seattle, Washington, U.S.

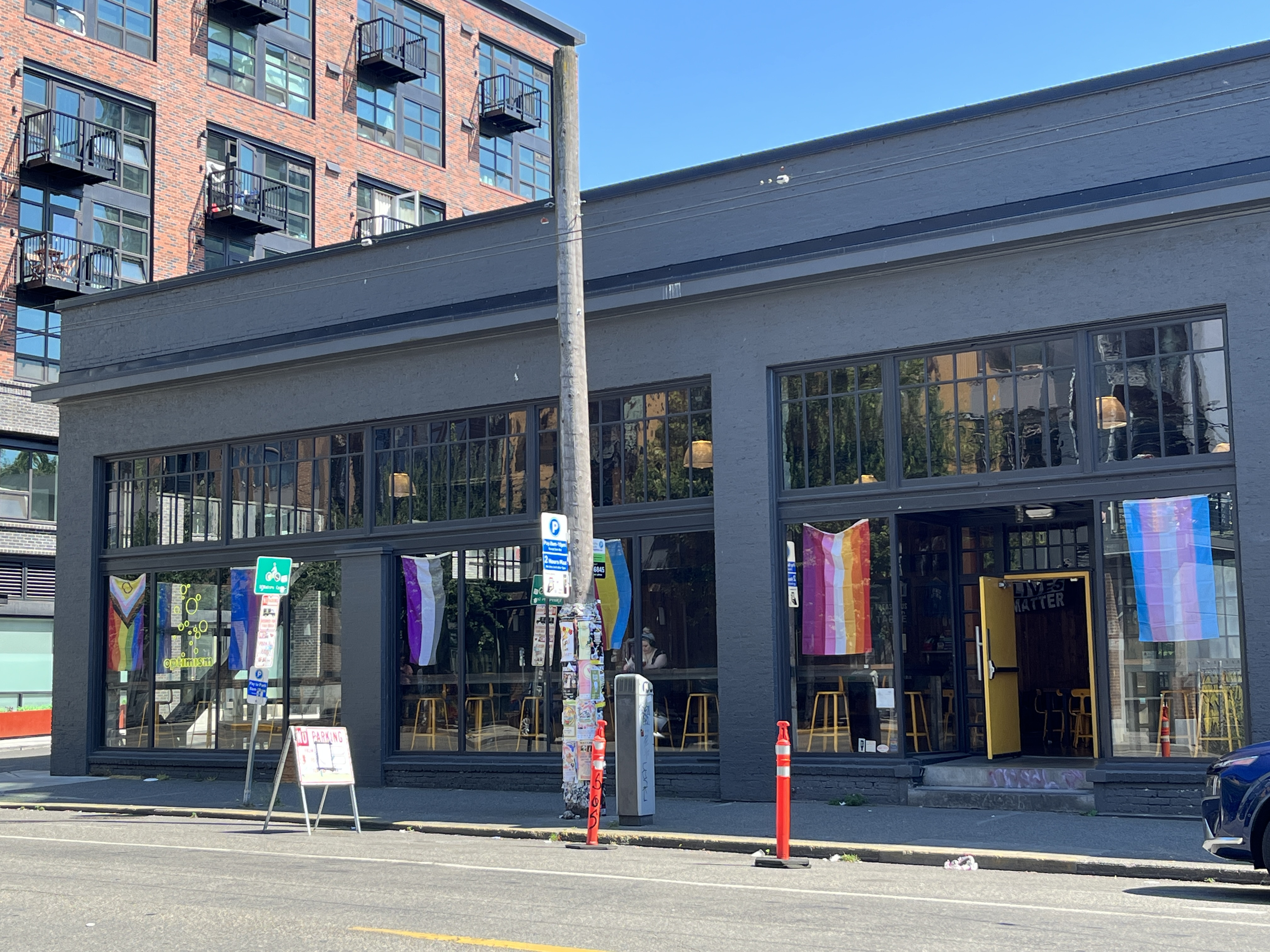
- The brewery's exterior, 2023
- Interactive map of Optimism Brewing Company

Restaurant information
- Established: 2013
- Owners: Troy Hakala; Gay Gilmore
- Coordinates: 47.6128°N 122.3205°W
- Website: optimismbrewing.com

Optimism Brewing Company was a brewery in Seattle, in the U.S. state of Washington. It was the largest taproom in Washington in terms of square footage as well as draft beer sales, and was purchased by Stoup Brewing in 2023.

== Description ==
Optimism Brewing Company was a brewery with a taproom in Seattle. Fodor's described the business as a "multifunctional third place for locals" by serving as a beer bar, a gathering space for events and parties, and a play space for children and dogs. The spacious venue had large windows and the interior had picnic tables. Guests could bring food, and food trucks were hosted outside. Optimism's Heliotropic was described as a "hoppy, tropical" India pale ale. Other beer names included Afraid of the Dark. Don't Boo, Unicorn, and Vote.

== History ==
Spouses Troy Hakala and Gay Gilmore established Optimism Brewing Company in 2013, then spent approximately two years converting a 16,000-square-foot warehouse into a brewery. The building was completed in 1920 and had previously served as a showroom for Great Western Motors Co. Olson Kundig designed the new Optimism space. Eater Seattle said "the space was innovative in many ways, including its gender-neutral bathrooms and a kids play area that made it especially welcoming for families". Optimism's taproom opened in December 2015.

Optimism did not serve food. Tipping was not required and cash was not accepted. During the COVID-19 pandemic, Optimism was the first business in Seattle to acquire a street permit for seating outdoors, and the brewery "started renting space as a part of a co-working program that involved reserving space for claustrophobic tech workers -- and included a beer".

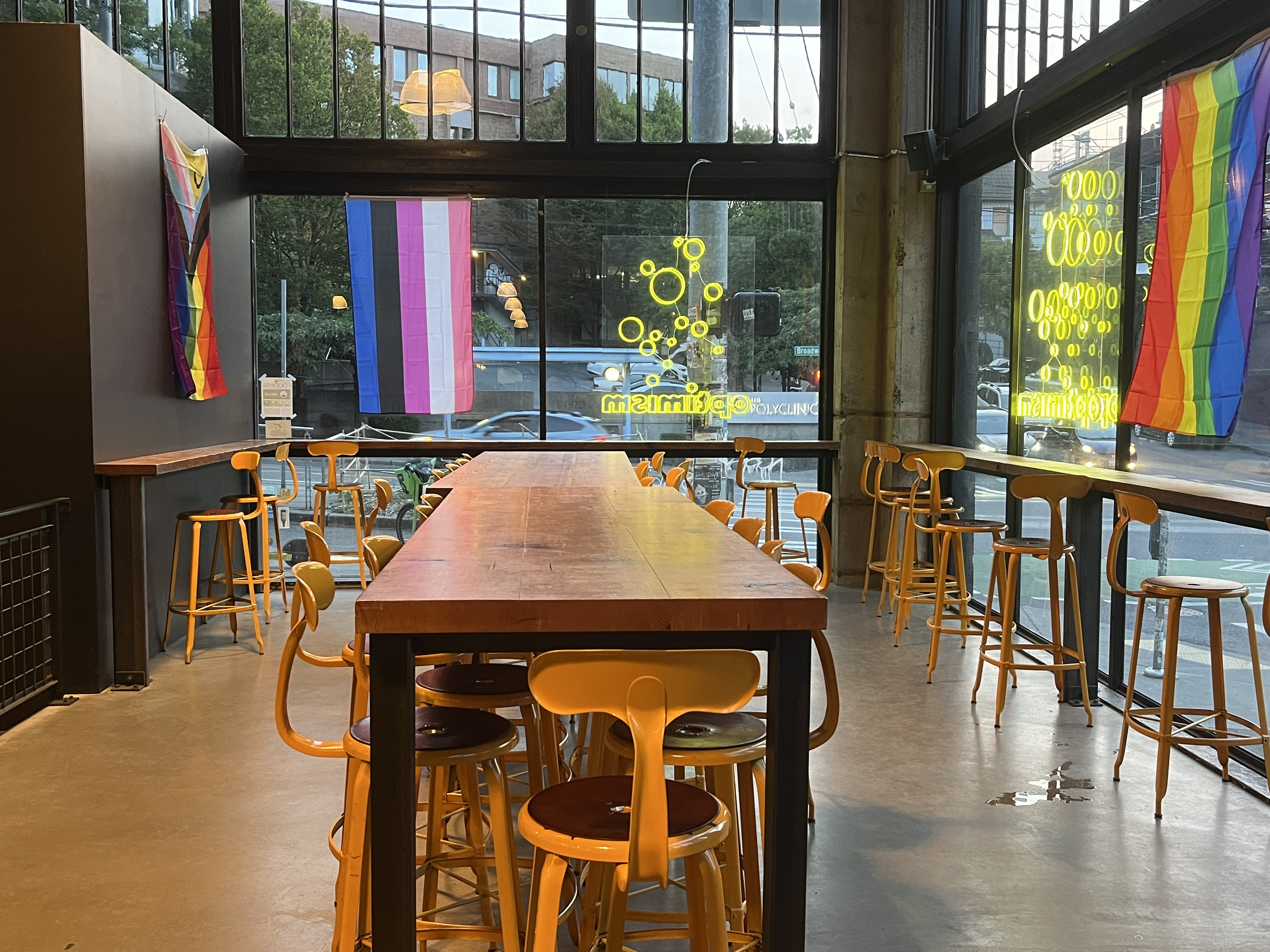
Interior, 2023

Optimism was Washington's largest taproom in terms of both square footage and draft beer sales. Optimism had 21 employees. Stoup Brewing purchased Optimism in 2023. Financial details have not been disclosed, and Hakala and Gilmore continued to own the building. Stoup committed to continuing Optimism's dog- and family-friendly environment.

== Reception ==
In 2017, Aimee Rizzo of The Infatuation wrote, "Don't come here looking for a basil-beet-dragonfruit-infused sour ale—Optimism is about simple, classic stuff. Grab a long table with your crew next to the mountain range of steel beer-making tanks, have a bite from the daily-rotating food truck, and Saturday afternoon is officially excellent." Jen Woo included Optimism in Time Out Seattle's 2021 list of "the 11 best Seattle breweries for a tasty pint". The brewery's Passion Fruit Solarpunk was awarded silver in the American-style fruit beer category at the Washington Beer Awards in 2021.

== See also ==
- List of breweries in Washington (state)
