= Bronzing =

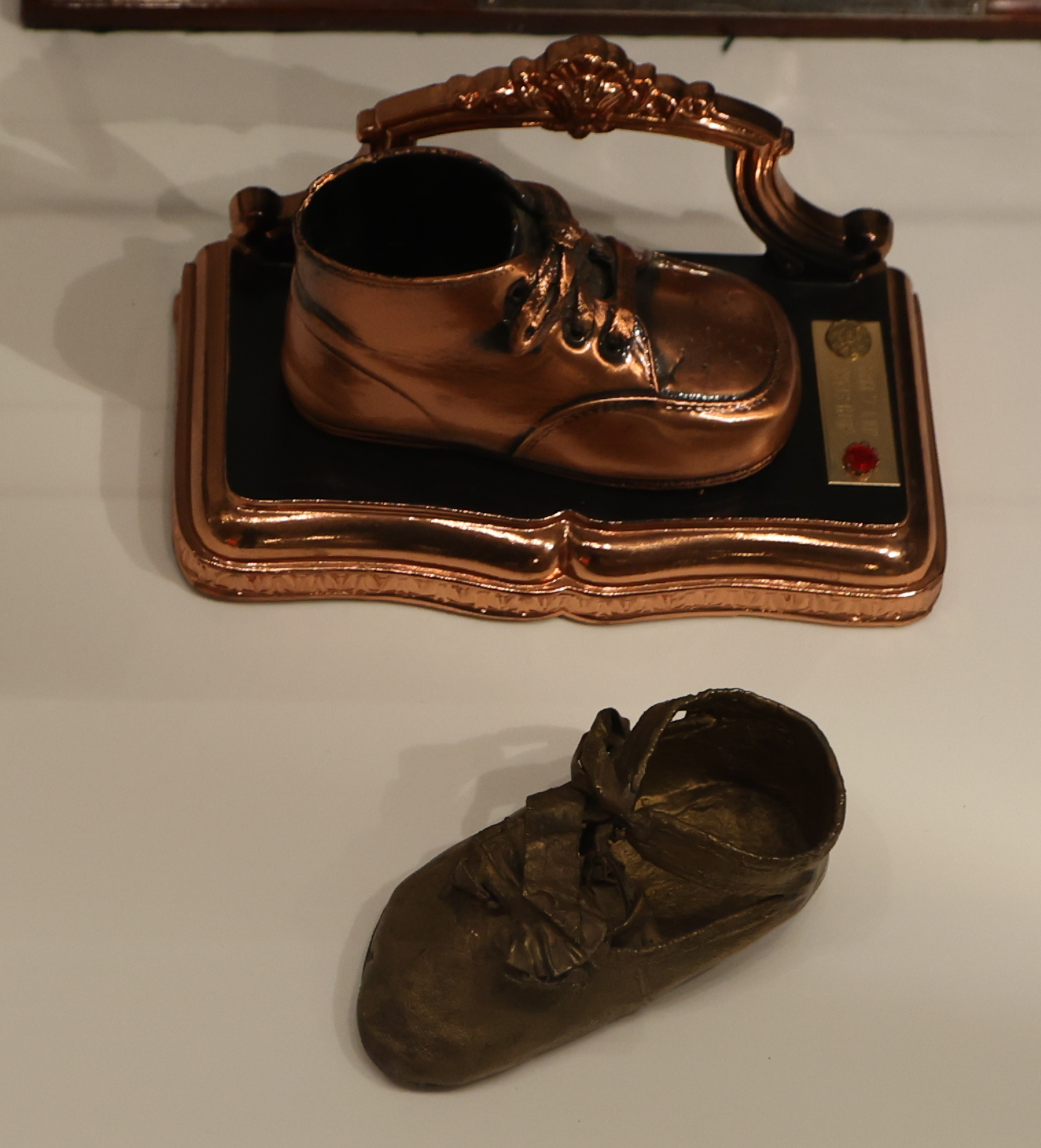
Bronzed baby shoes

Bronzing is a process by which a bronze-like surface is applied to other materials (metallic or non-metallic). Some bronzing processes are merely simulated finishes (patinas) applied to existing metal surfaces, or coatings of powdered metal that give the appearance of a solid metal surface. In other cases, an actual layer of heavy copper is electroplated onto an object to produce a bronze-like surface. This electroplating is the method traditionally used for "bronzing" of baby shoes, but to electroplate a non-conductive item like a baby shoe, a conductive material must first be applied, then the copper plating is done.

== See also ==
- Gilding
- Copper electroplating
