= Hat 'n' Boots =

Roadside attraction in Seattle, Washington, U.S.

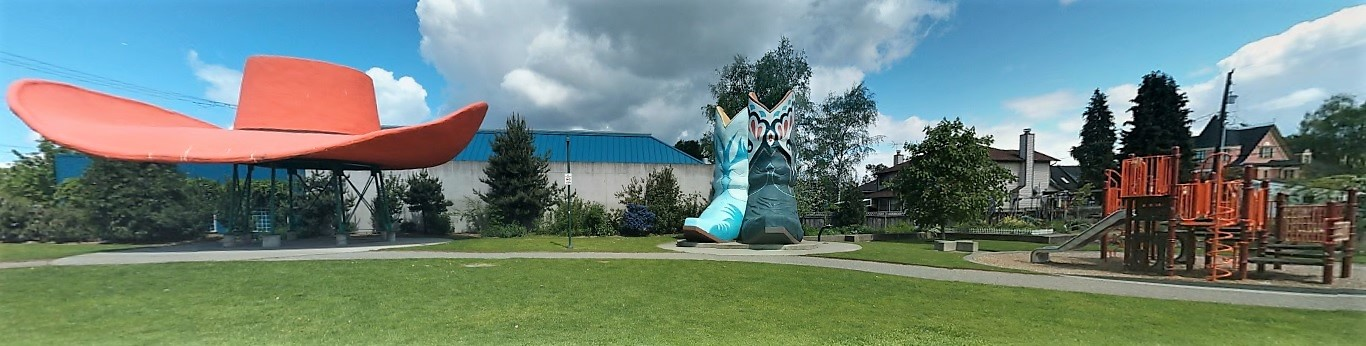
- The Hat and Boots of Oxbow Park

- Location within Washington (state)
- 47°32′42″N 122°19′18″W
- Location: Seattle, Washington

Seattle Landmark
- Designated: June 20, 2023

Hat 'n' Boots is a roadside attraction and landmark in the Georgetown neighborhood of Seattle, Washington. It was designed by commercial artist Lewis Naysmith, with permit drawings by architect, Albert Poe. Built in 1954 as part of a Western-themed gas station called Premium Tex service station, it operated from 1954 to 1988. It is billed as the largest hat and cowboy boots in America. To preserve this landmark, the City of Seattle moved the Hat 'n' Boots to the new Oxbow Park in December 2003.

Hat 'n' Boots appeared in the films National Lampoon's Vacation (during the opening credits) and Hype!
