= Oxbow Park (Seattle) =

Park in Seattle, Washington, U.S.

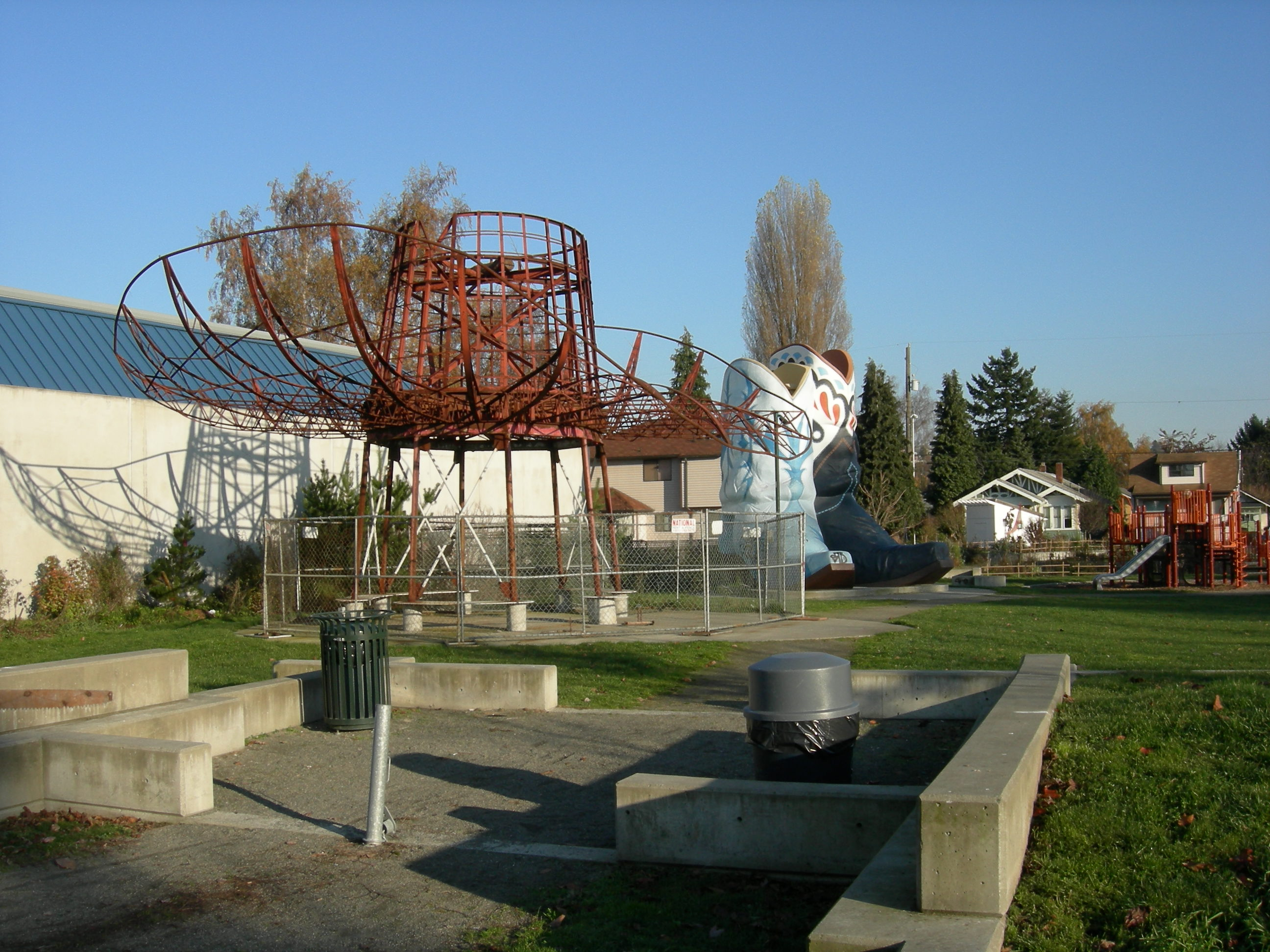
- The park in 2007
- Interactive map of Oxbow Park
- Location: Seattle, Washington
- Coordinates: 47.545088°N 122.321582°W
- Operator: Seattle Parks and Recreation
- Status: Open all year

Oxbow Park is a public park in the Georgetown neighborhood of Seattle, Washington. It houses the landmark Hat 'n' Boots roadside attraction, which was relocated to the park.
