= Georgetown, Seattle =

Neighborhood of Seattle, Washington, US

- Seattle neighborhood
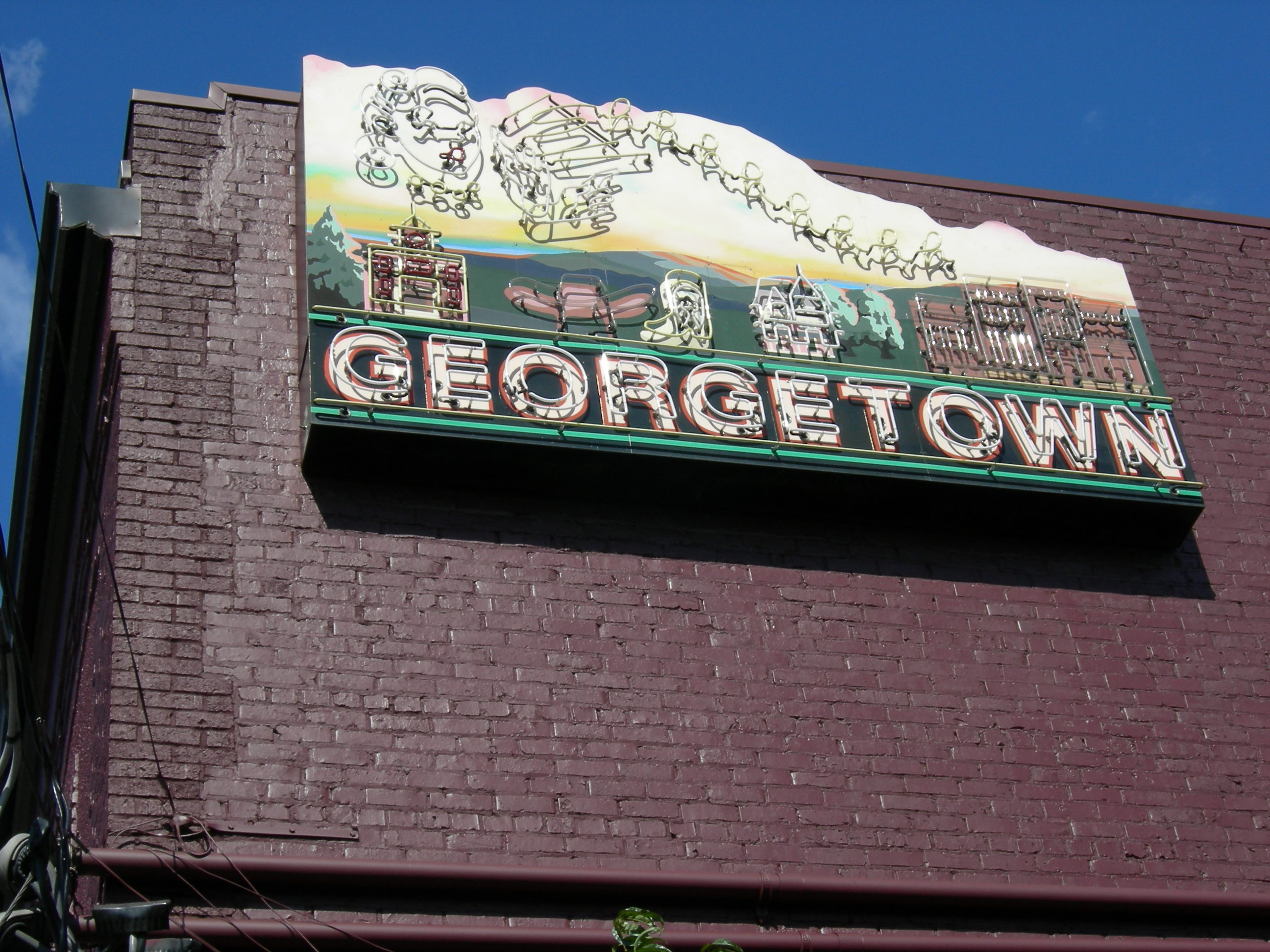
- The Georgetown sign

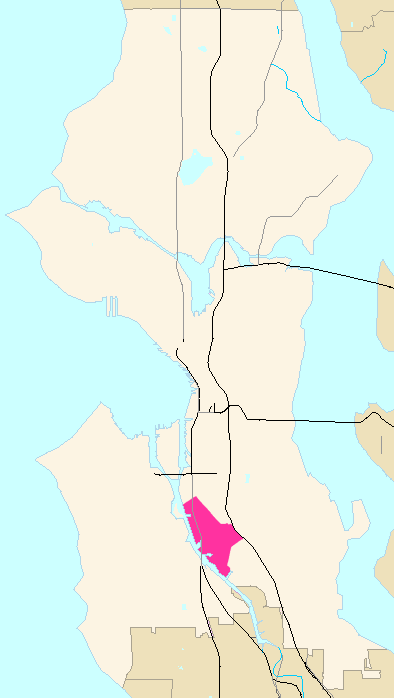
- Georgetown highlighted in pink
- Coordinates: 47°32′35″N 122°19′14″W
- Country: United States
- State: Washington
- County: King
- City: Seattle
- Time zone: UTC−8 (PST)
  - Summer (DST): UTC−7 (PDT)
- ZIP Code: 98108
- Area code: 206, 564

Georgetown is a neighborhood in southern Seattle, Washington, United States. It is bounded on the north by the mainlines of the BNSF Railway and Union Pacific Railroad, beyond which is the Industrial District; on the west by the Duwamish River, across which is South Park; on the east by Interstate 5, beyond which is Beacon Hill; and on the south by Boeing Field.

Despite being surrounded by industry and major transportation corridors, Georgetown retains a sizeable number of residences and businesses.

== History ==
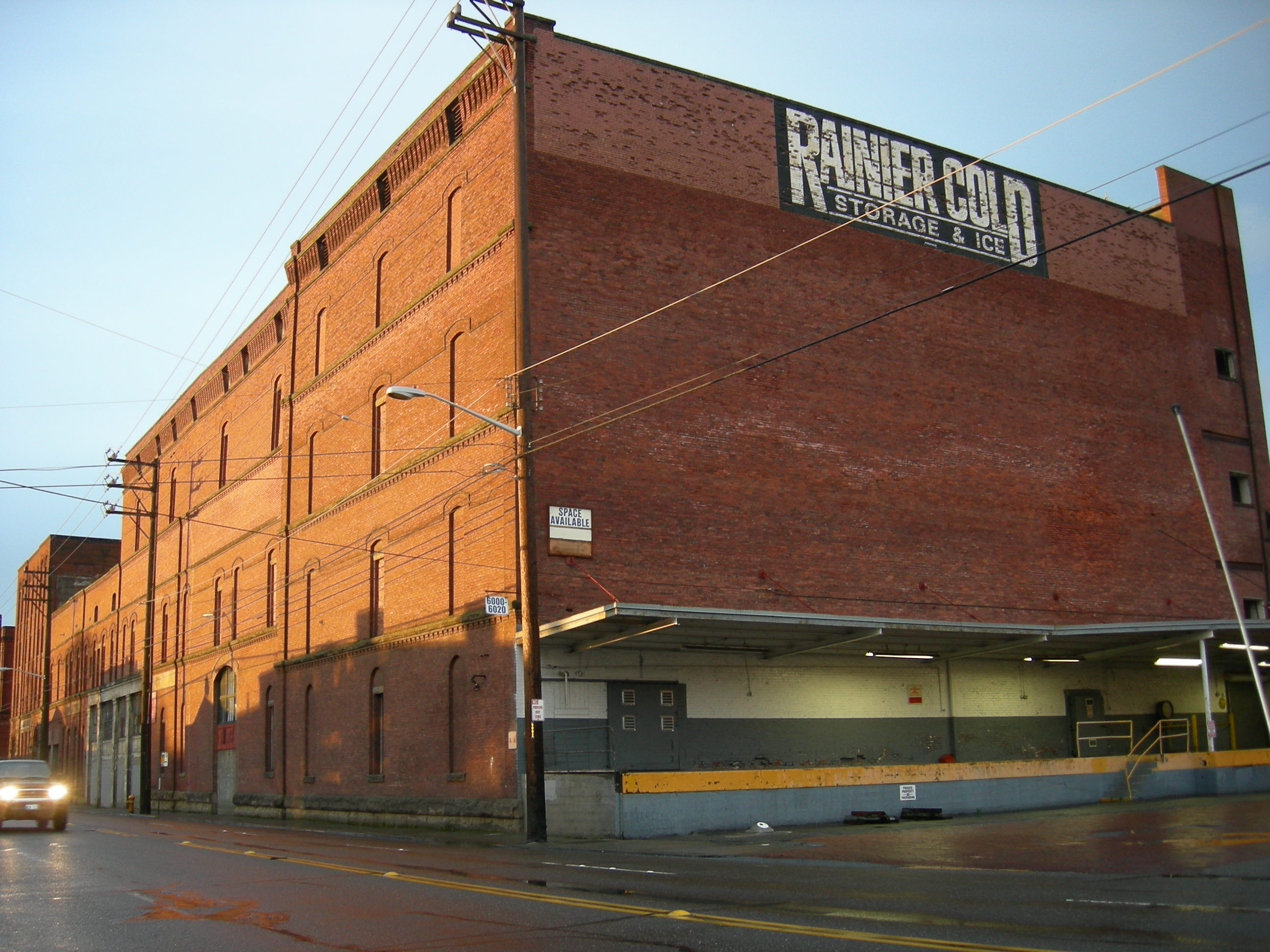
Stock House of the Georgetown brewery, now demolished

Georgetown is arguably the oldest neighborhood of Seattle. Georgetown's first settlement was founded on September 27, 1851, when Luther Collins, Henry Van Asselt, and the Maple family arrived with their household goods with the intention of farming the rich alluvial lands of the Duwamish delta. Although the Denny Party arrived at Alki Point two days prior to the Collins Party arrival, the Collins Party was able to complete permanent structures and build a successful farming community within a year. The Denny Party suffered in relative squalor in an unfinished cabin and encampment until their move in 1852 to the future downtown Seattle area. The Collins farm was located in the vicinity of the present-day First Avenue Bridge, running north to the vicinity of South Idaho Street, on the east bank of the Duwamish River.

Farms in the Duwamish Valley supplied the lumber-based settlement in Seattle. Boatwrights set up shop along the Duwamish estuary as land was cleared for farming. Before land transport links with Seattle were established, the economic hub of the Duwamish was a boat landing at the approximate location of the South Lucille Street/East Marginal Way junction. In 1869 a Seattle saloon and brothel keeper rented a portion of the Collins homestead from Luther's widow Diana (Borst) Collins to run a horse track, making the area a destination for all sorts of manly fun. Developer Julius Horton, brother of Seattle banker Dexter Horton, purchased a portion of the Collins homestead in 1871 and began to plat the lots that would become the community of Georgetown.

The Duwamish community's transition towards a rail-centered economy began on March 7, 1877, with the first run on a new rail line between Steele's Landing on the Duwamish and coal mines in Renton. In 1878 the line was extended to Newcastle (east of Lake Washington) and it was later extended to other coal sites in south King County. Although rail lines connecting Georgetown to Seattle had been constructed as early as 1878, Steele's Landing retained its importance for commerce with Seattle until a reliable, permanent rail connection was established in October 1885. In 1884 the rail line got connected to the Northern Pacific line to the south, and by 1889 transcontinental service came to Georgetown. With an abundance of flat land that Seattle lacked, Georgetown became the site of the rail yard servicing the new freight traffic. The freight hub in Georgetown fostered the development of industries capitalizing on its access to resources and rail-to-market, including breweries, lumber mills, brickyards, and foundries. Reconstruction of Seattle after the fire of 1889 and its rapid growth in the following decade boosted demand for building materials supplied by Georgetown. With fill provided by waste from an early regrade attempt on Beacon Hill, the industrial area grew northward across the former tideflats.

With access to good hop-growing areas in the valleys of the Duwamish drainage and a large contingent of German immigrants, Georgetown became the sixth-largest beer producing district in the world. A Georgetown brewing company began operations in 1882 and in 1888 acquired the Seattle Brewery with its Rainier brand. The holdings were incorporated as the Seattle Malting and Brewing Company in 1892. The old Seattle Brewery was reopened and expanded after Prohibition ended. The red brick brewery, home to artists and small businesses, dominates the commercial district along Airport Way S. The old Georgetown brewery was used as a warehouse and cold storage facility. Recent years have seen the opening of several microbreweries with pubs in Georgetown, in a nod to the neighborhood's roots fitting with its revival as an entertainment and cultural district.

The unincorporated community was named Georgetown by Julius Horton, after his son, in 1890. In 1890 a County Poor Farm was established along the Duwamish in the southern part of Georgetown. In 1893 Seattle streetcar service came to Georgetown and the King County Hospital was built near the corner of Orcas Street and Corson Avenue, east of the Poor Farm. In 1898 Georgetown's first local school was established. In 1902 the Seattle-Tacoma interurban line came through Georgetown, which became the site of its car barns. In 1906 the Georgetown Steam Plant brought electric power to Georgetown as well as providing power for Seattle streetcars and the Seattle-Tacoma interurban line.

Georgetown existed as an independent city from 1904 to 1910, when it was annexed by Seattle. Georgetown incorporated in 1904 largely as a defense against the prospect that Seattle would adopt local Prohibition, which could impact Georgetown's ability to keep operating saloons and breweries as an unincorporated area adjoining a dry city. With Seattle increasingly cracking down on public sinfulness within its boundaries, Georgetown caught the windfall with its twenty-four 24 hour saloons, some of which advertised lodging arrangements, and horse racing track. Once Seattle rejected local-option Prohibition, a movement for annexation gained widespread support. Following presentation of a petition for an annexation vote in 1909, a special election was held on March 29, 1910. The annexation proposition passed with 389 votes in favor and 238 opposed. The City of Georgetown, with its 4000 residents, was officially consolidated with Seattle on April 4, 1910. The Old Georgetown City Hall (1909) is now on the National Register of Historic Places as is the Georgetown Steam Plant (1906).

Statewide Prohibition, enacted in 1914, closed Georgetown's brewing industry, but the district remained a growing industrial and transportation center for Seattle. Straightening and deepening of the Duwamish waterway completed in 1916 made it more accessible for maritime commerce, bringing more waterfront business to the area. A meander loop of the Duwamish through the center of Georgetown was cut off and filled; the old channel and interior of the loop became a new warehouse district served by rail spurs. The Duwamish waterway attracted the Boeing Company, who set up shop in a former shipyard across the Duwamish from Georgetown to manufacture seaplanes. Boeing expanded through the 1920s; its land plane testing airstrip in a field south of Georgetown became a public airport (now called Boeing Field) in 1928 and Boeing constructed a new aircraft assembly plant west of the airport in the mid-1930s. The main north–south automotive route through the Puget Sound region was established through the western part of Georgetown in 1928.

Following the burgeoning industry and trade came a steep decline of the residential neighborhood. Dated and downscale housing stock, congestion, and the worst air and noise pollution in the city made it an unattractive place to settle. The library branch was closed in 1948, the neighborhood movie theater closed in 1952, and neighborhood stores closed. Business strips along the thoroughfares expanded onto the cheap land in the struggling neighborhood. The neighborhood population was increasingly divided between elderly long-term residents and short-term renters. During the 1960s the Georgetown elementary school experienced a turnover rate among students of over 90% some years and enrollment declined to less than one third of what it had been during its peak. The school was closed in 1971. As of the 1990s only scattered remnants of the old residential neighborhood remained, housing approximately 1500 residents with a poverty rate of 25%.

== 21st-century revival ==
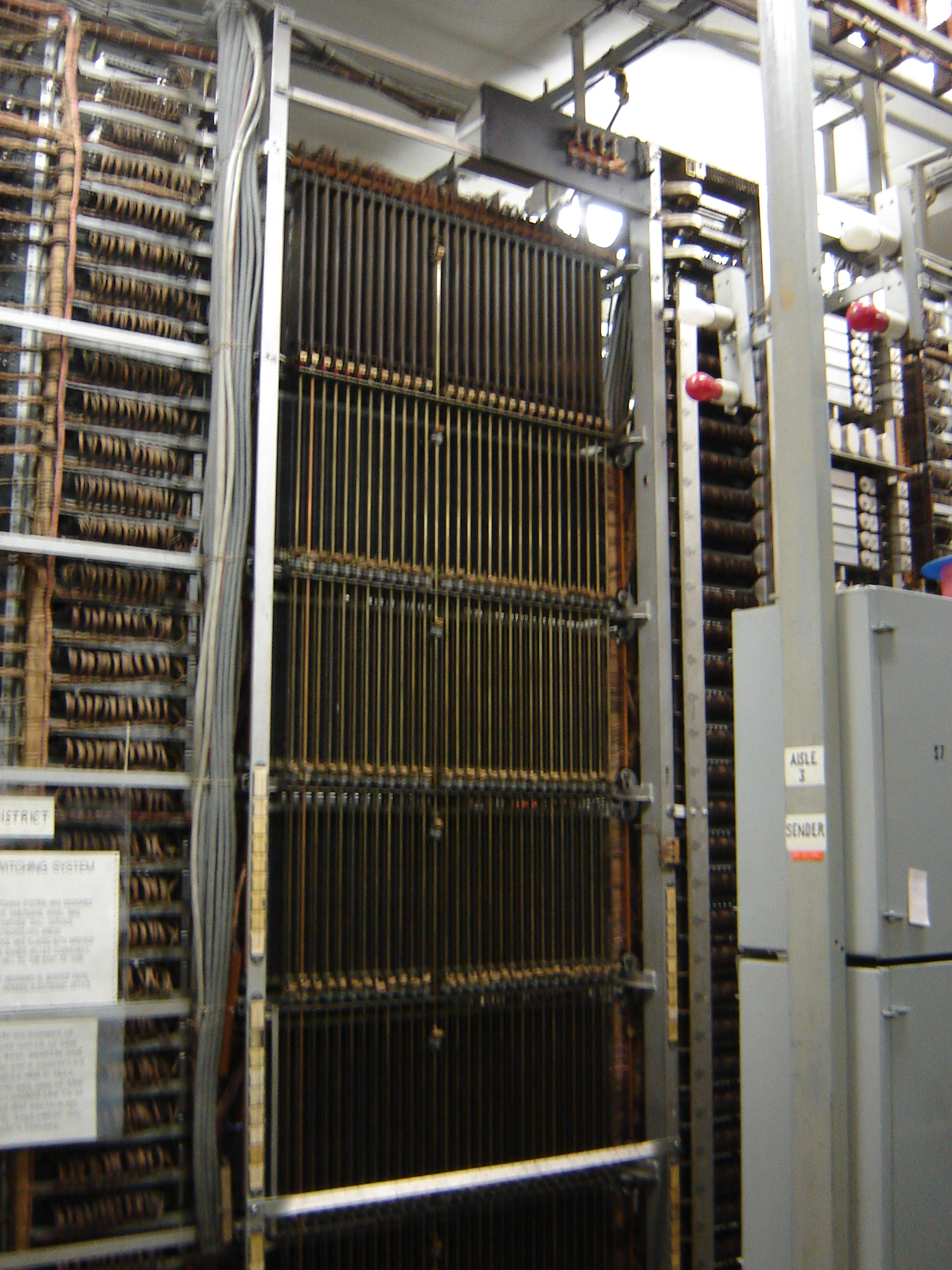
Panel switch district selector frame at the Connections Museum in Georgetown

Georgetown has had a certain degree of a "scene" since the 1990s. In 2001, Industrial Coffee and Stella Pizza were both hosting live musical performances. The former folded, and the latter stopped hosting shows and changed its name to Stellar Pizza. Since that time, however, quite a few new bars and coffeehouses have opened in the neighborhood, plus a record store, a beer store, a barber shop, a circus school (SANCA), a bakery, a scooter shop, a "skin sanctuary" (waxing salon), a web design company, and an art gallery/recording studio. Laura Cassidy of the Seattle Weekly described the prevailing aesthetic: "Creatively employing the open, airy brick-walled spaces left behind by industry and manufacturing, and augmenting them with local art and 20th-century detritus, Georgetown's merchants consistently fashion warm, imaginative interiors: places you want to visit and never want to leave. Just walking through the streets you witness post-squat, industrial bohemian chic." Recent years have seen multiple-unit housing built in some of the remaining residential blocks near the old red brick commercial and industrial district.

== Gallery ==
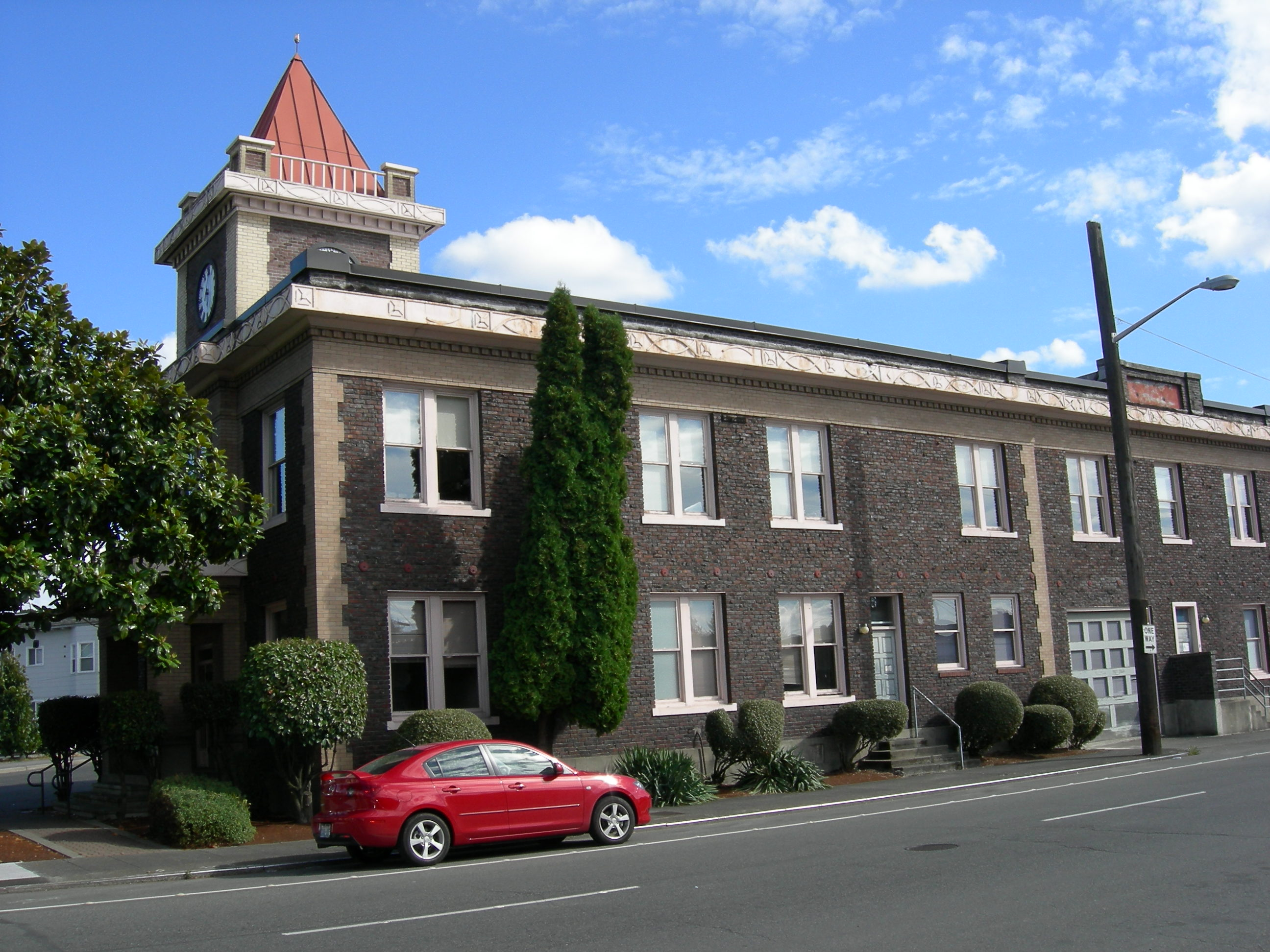
Old City Hall

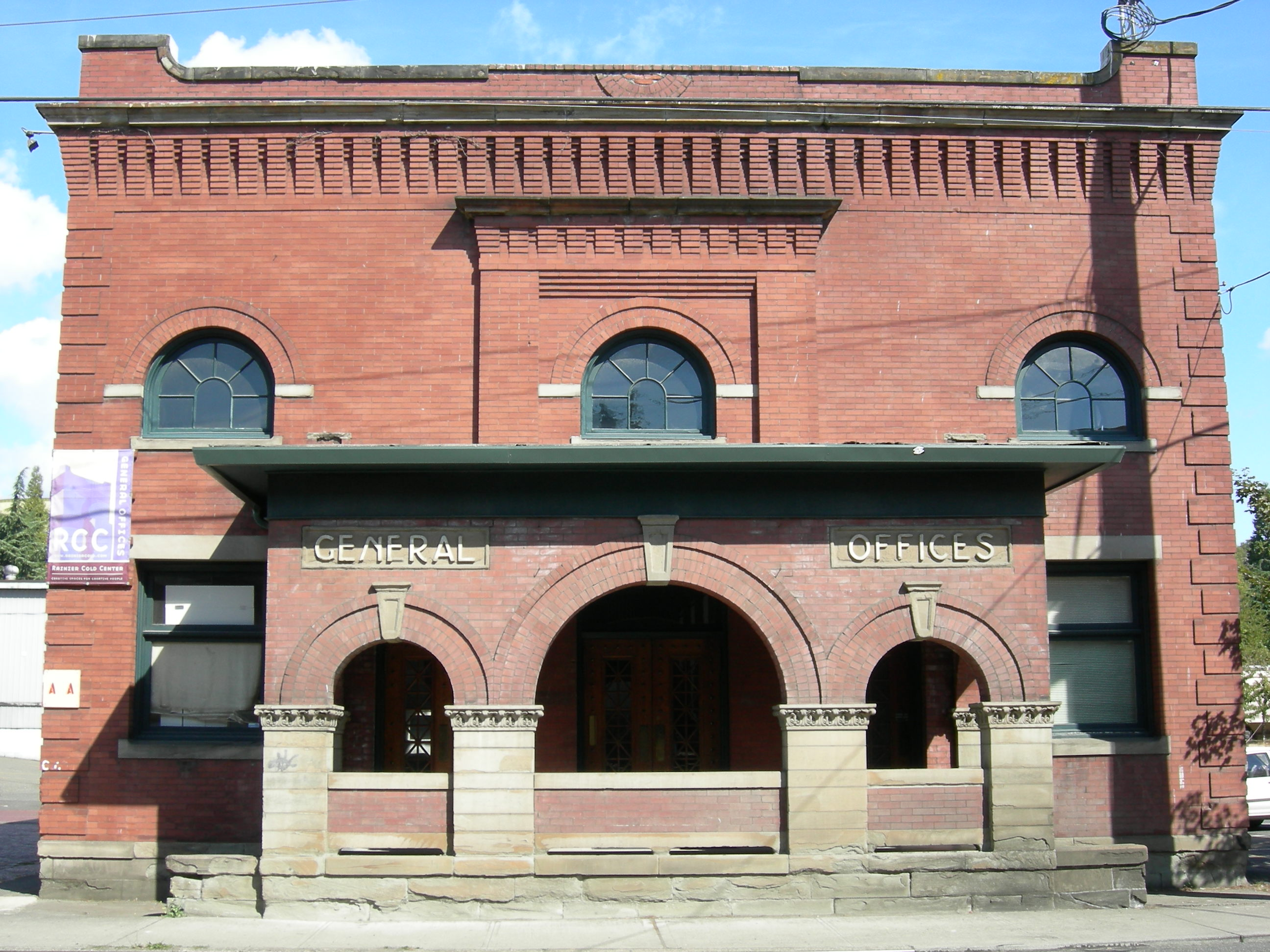
Seattle Brewing & Malting Company offices

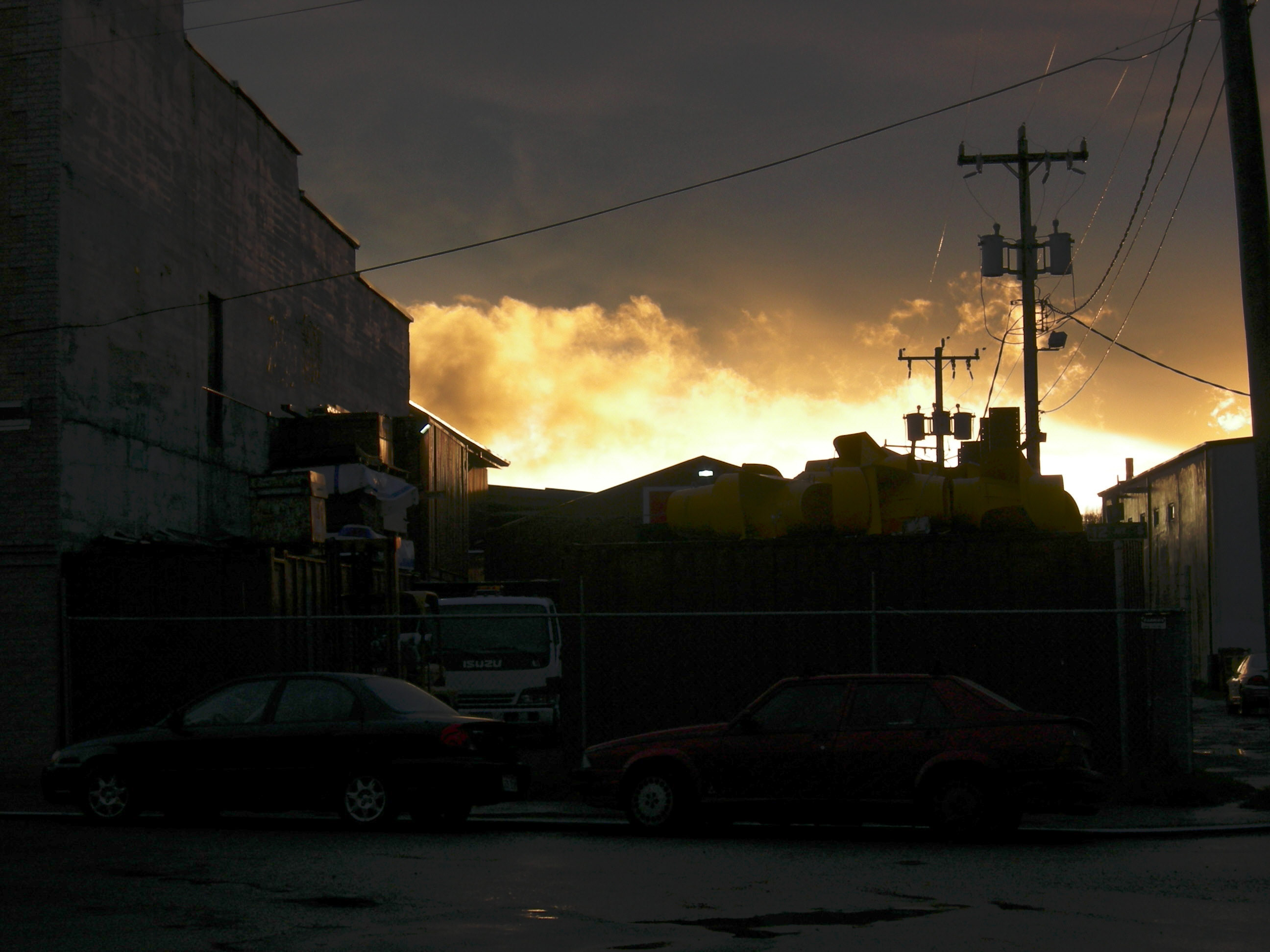
Sunset over industrial Georgetown

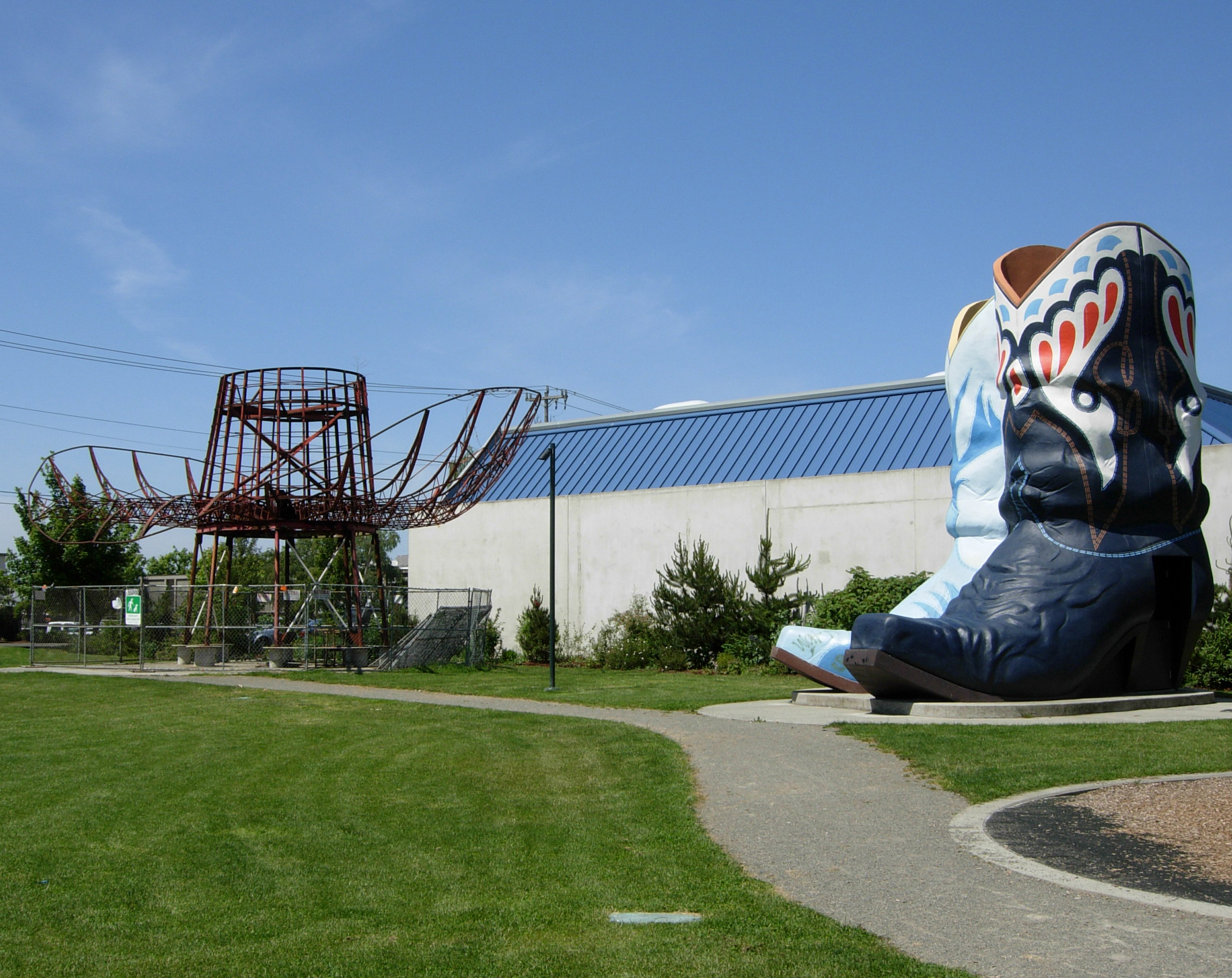
The Hat 'n' Boots at Oxbow Park
