= North Fork Brewery =

The North Fork Brewery, is a pizzeria, brewery, and wedding chapel, which is located on the way to Mount Baker on State Route 542 in Deming, Washington. In addition to brewing IPAs, barleywines, and other ales in their relatively small 3.5 barrel brewing system, the North Fork serves pizza, houses a diverse collection of beer-related objects, and performs marriage ceremonies. The North Fork Brewery opened in 1997.
