= Mac & Jack's Brewing Company =

Craft brewery in Redmond, Washington

- Location: 17825 Northeast 65th St, Redmond, WA 98052
- Opened: 1993
- Owner: Mac Rankin and Jack Schropp
- Website: www.macandjacks.com

Active beers
| Name | Type |
| African Amber | Amber Ale |
| Serengeti | Wheat |
| Blackcat | Porter |
| Experimental Series | IPA |
| Resolution | IPA |
| Theoretical Mass | Stout |

Seasonal beers
| Name | Type |
| Sum'Shine | Pale Ale |
| SummerStay | IPA |
| Basket Case | DIPA |
| Jitterbug | Porter |

Other beers
| Name | Type |
| Bourbon Barrel Aged CDA | Barrel Aged CDA |

Inactive beers
| Name | Type |
| Two Tun IPA | IPA |

Mac & Jack's Brewing Company is a craft brewery in Redmond, Washington.

== History ==
Mac & Jack's began as a home brewery in the early 1990s by Mac Rankin and Jack Schropp. The two brewed in Schropp's garage until 1997, when the operation was moved to a former transmission shop in a Redmond business park. In 2001, the brewery's limited staff produced 24,000 barrels for sale in Washington, Oregon, and Idaho. By 2010, the Brewers Association ranked Mac & Jack's the 39th largest craft brewery in the country by volume sold.

The association's study also showed that the brewery almost made the top 50 list that included macrobreweries.

Former employees have gone on to found the Black Raven Brewing Company and the Georgetown Brewing Company.

== Brews ==
Until 2014 Mac and Jack's beers were only offered on draft, but beginning in 2014 limited runs of their speciality beers have been offered in 22 oz. bottles. In 2016 they have begun small 12oz canning runs. The brewery's flagship beer is the African Amber. During 2020 they began selling and advertising their African Amber in 12oz. cans.

As of 2009, the African Amber accounted for 95% of production. As of 2010 the African Amber is one of the best-selling craft beers in the state of Washington. Mac & Jack's also produces a hefeweizen called Serengeti Wheat. The African and Serengeti were originally developed by Mac as house brews for a pub located near the Woodland Park Zoo in Seattle. Another standard beer of the brewery is the Black Cat Porter.

== See also ==
- Barrel-aged beer
