= Old Post Office (Pullman, Washington) =

- U.S. Post Office-Pullman
- U.S. National Register of Historic Places
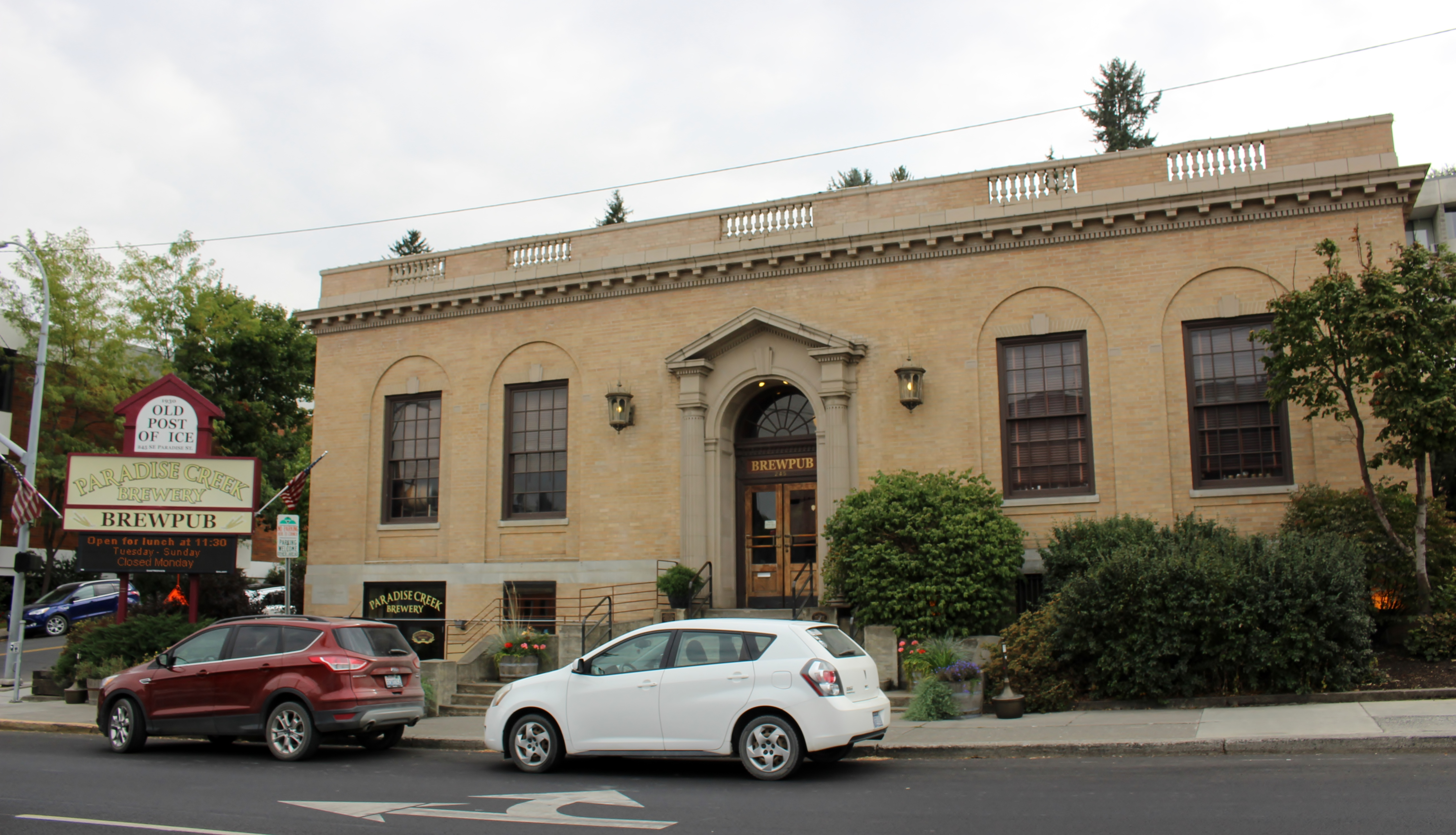
- Paradise Creek Brewery in 2017

- Location within Washington (state)
- Nearest city: Pullman, Washington
- Coordinates: 46°43′44″N 117°10′46″W
- Area: Less than one acre
- Built: 1930
- Built by: Fred R. Comb Co.
- Architect: Office of the Supervising Architect under James A. Wetmore
- Architectural style: Late 19th- and 20th-century revivals
- MPS: Historic US Post Offices in Washington MPS
- NRHP reference No.: 03000810
- Added to NRHP: August 21, 2003

The Old Post Office is a historic building in Pullman, Washington listed on the National Register of Historic Places as U.S. Post Office-Pullman. The building served as Pullman's post office until 1975, when a new post office was constructed. The Old Post Office subsequently hosted various businesses, including a movie theater, a bakery, and a gun store. In 2002, a new owner began restoration of the building, leading to its NRHP listing in 2003. In 2005, the Old Post Office was home to a wine shop, a wine bar, a winery, and a café. As of 2010, the building is the home of Paradise Creek Brewery, a microbrewery and brewpub.
