= Rainier Brewing Company =

American brewing company (1878–1999)

- Industry: Brewing
- Founded: 1878 in Seattle, WA
- Founder: Andrew Hemrich
- Defunct: 1999
- Headquarters: Seattle, Washington
- Key people: Andrew Hemrich; Emil Sick
- Products: Beer
- Owner: Pabst Brewing Company
- Website: www.rainierbeer.com

The Rainier Brewing Company is an American owned beer brand, originally established in Seattle, Washington. Rainier Beer remains a popular brand in the Pacific Northwest of the United States. Although Rainier was founded in 1884, the Seattle site had been brewing beer since 1878. The beer is not currently brewed in Seattle but remains American owned with a Seattle-based sales and marketing team. After a series of ownership transfers starting in the 1970s, the company was sold to Stroh's and then to Pabst Brewing Company by the late 1990s. The brewery was closed by Pabst in 1999 and sold, while Rainier beer continues to be sold by Pabst.

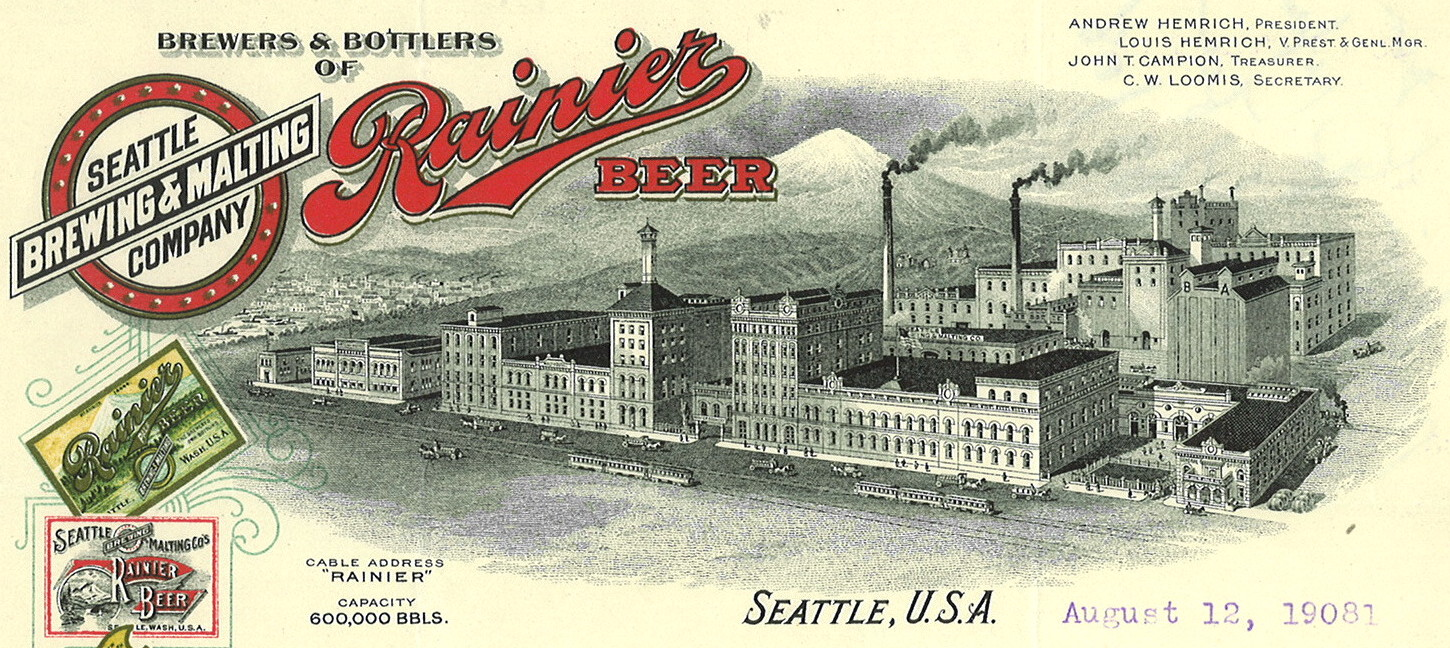
1908 letterhead from Seattle Brewing and Malting Co.

The brewery itself is a well-known fixture in the south end of town, adjacent to I-5 just north of the Spokane Street Viaduct. The plant was home to the Tully's Coffee headquarters, Bartholomew Winery, Red Soul Motorcycle Fabrications, as well as artist lofts, band practice spaces, and a recording studio. The trademark red neon "R" that sat atop the building was replaced with a green "T" built by local Seattle sign company Western Neon, when Tully's was using the plant to roast coffee. The neon "R", also refurbished by Western Neon, is now on display at Seattle's Museum of History and Industry. The green "T" was removed on September 30, 2013 by Tully's, and a red neon replica "R", built by Western Neon, returned to the top of the brewery on October 24, 2013. The Rainier brand is currently owned and operated by Pabst Brewing Company. In Canada, it is owned, brewed, and distributed by Sleeman Breweries as Rainier Lager.

== History ==
=== Origins ===
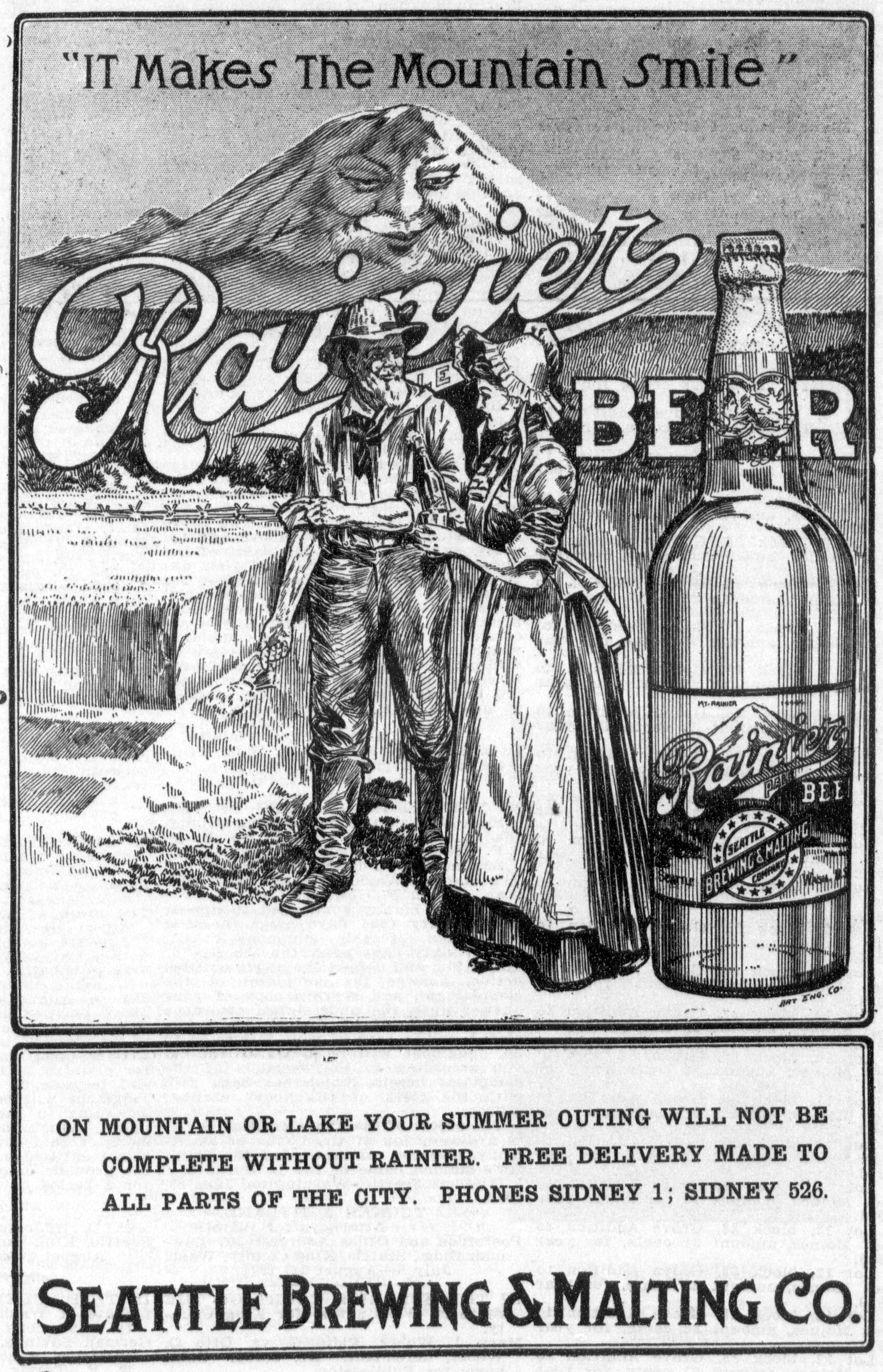
1912 Rainier ad in The Seattle Republican newspaper.

The original brewery dates all the way back to 1854 when A.B. Rabbeson opened Washington Brewery, which was Seattle’s first commercial brewing company. In 1872, Rabbeson renamed his brewery Seattle Brewery. They launched Rainier beer in 1878 and would produce and distribute Rainier for the next decade. Concurrently, John Kopp and Andrew Hemrich founded the Bay View Brewing Company in 1883, with Kopp's interest soon being bought out by Hemrich's father John, who had previously operated a brewery in Alma, Wisconsin; the rest of the Hemrich clan would soon relocate to Seattle, either joining Andrew's brewery or starting new ones. In 1888, Rabbeson sold his brewery, along with the Rainier brand, to Hemrich. In 1893 the Seattle Brewing & Malting Company would be formed by the merger of the Bay View brewery with the Claussen & Sweeney brewery at Georgetown and the Albert Braun Brewing Company located further south. Andrew Hemrich would become president of the new company and remain until his death in 1910; he would be succeeded by his brother Louis Hemrich. The Georgetown brewery would become the headquarters of the new corporation and the brewery itself would undergo a major period of construction in the early 1900s making it one of the largest in the world.

=== The Prohibition era ===
The Hemrichs produced Rainier beer in Washington until 1916, when the state of Washington enacted its own prohibition, 4 years before the 18th amendment enacted the nationwide prohibition. During this time they opened a brewery in San Francisco where they brewed Rainier beer until 1920 when the 18th amendment was ratified. The company survived prohibition by producing a variety of different nonalcoholic products. In Seattle they would maintain the Georgetown brewery as little more than a distribution center and would lease the Bay View branch out as a feed mill.

=== Post-Prohibition relaunch ===
Following the repeal of the Prohibition, the Bay View brewery was purchased by Lethbridge, Alberta brewers Fritz and Emil Sick, who then repurchased the Rainier brand and began brewing Rainier in 1935. The brewery went through several names, such as Sicks' Seattle Brewing and Malting and Sicks' Rainier Brewing Company, during the 1935–1977 period.

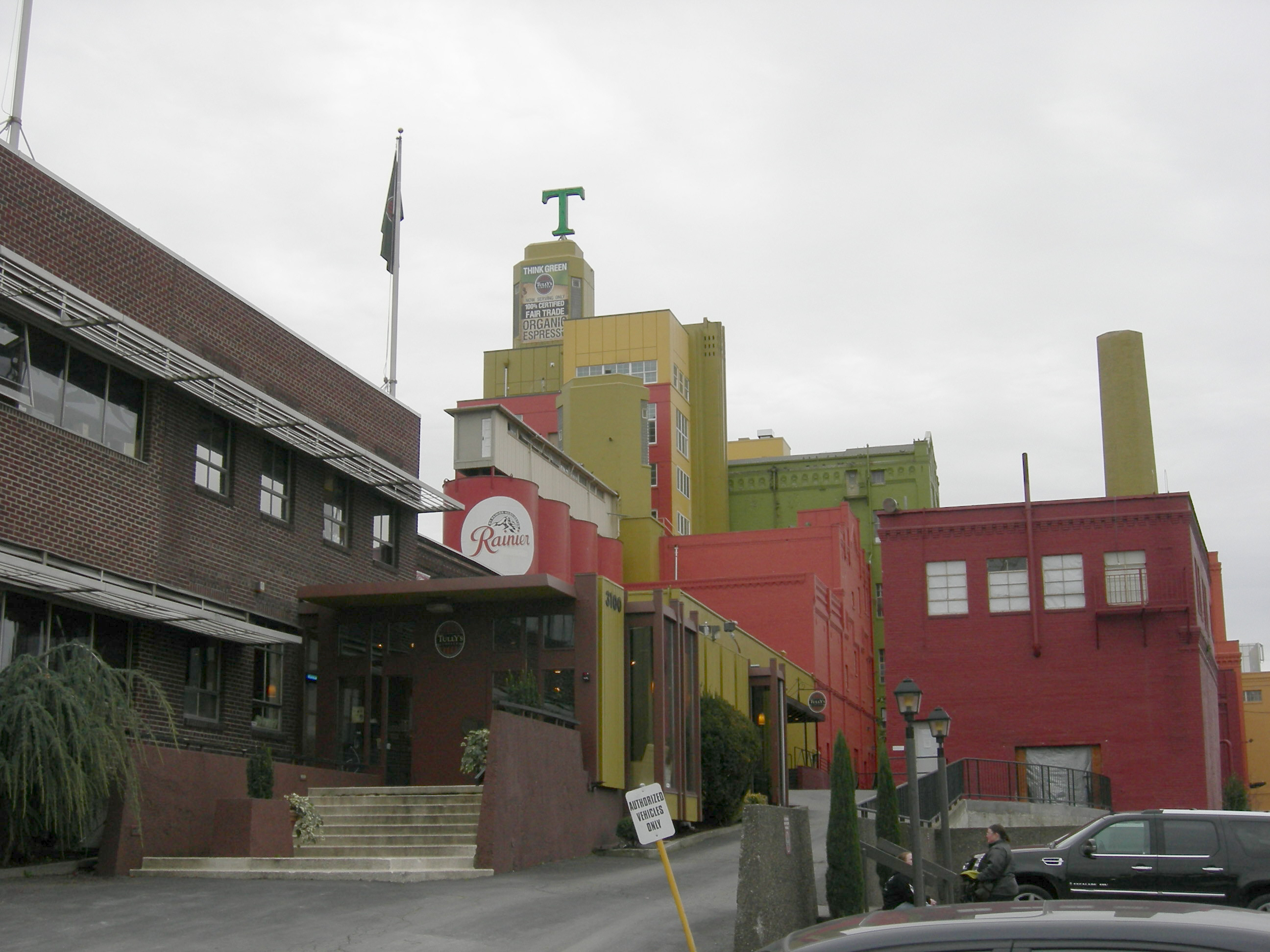
Sicks' Seattle Brewing & Malting Co. Brewery, also known as Bayview Brewery or simply as "The Brewery", now the headquarters of Tully's Coffee

After Rainier Brewing Company resumed producing "Rainier Beer" after the end of Prohibition and its advertisements became ubiquitous in the Seattle-Tacoma area, a rumor began circulating that the brewery's owner, Emil Sick, had bribed a Washington state committee with free beer to name the local mountain "Rainier". This, however, is an urban legend and can still be heard today among Tacoma residents who preferred the alternate name of "Mount Tacoma". Sick did, however, purchase the local baseball team and named them the Seattle Rainiers for this purpose.

Sicks also brewed Rainier at a branch brewery in Spokane, which closed in 1962.

=== Creative packaging ===
From 1952 to 1964, Rainier came packaged in a series of decorative beer cans known as the Rainier Jubilee Series. First in the series were a set of Christmas cans marketed in late 1952 and again in late 1953; these cans are rare and highly collectible today. The Christmas cans proved such a success that Rainier's use of decorative Jubilee Series cans continued for over a decade, with thousands of different designs. Most of these are not as rare and collectible as the Christmas cans, but the "reindeer" cans (which were sold only in Alaska), and the first pull tab Jubilee cans (made only in the last couple of years of the Jubilee Series) are also considered rare. Jubilee cans were re-released in 2013 as an homage to the versions in the 50s and 60s, and beginning around 2021, the brand re-conceptualized Jubilee under leadership of Sean McKillop, Rainier Brand Director. The modern Jubilee cans feature illustrations that pay tribute to various pieces of the brands history. In 2024, the Jubilee illustration referenced the most iconic Rainier print ad of all time, Barbeerian vs Sasquatch, and in '25 featured a modern scene depicting the iconic motorcycle commercial from the 1980s.

=== Other Products ===
Other brands of beer brewed by Sick's Rainier Brewing during this time included Rheinlander and Sick's Select. Later, the Rainier brewery would also take over brewing Heidelberg beer after its brewery in Tacoma, Washington, closed. Each of these brands (as well as rival Northwest brands Lucky Lager, Olympia, and Blitz-Weinhard) were once staples in the Pacific Northwest beer market, but starting in the 1960s and 1970s began losing market share to the major national brands.

In 2020, Rainier Brewing introduced their first distilled alcohol: Mountain Fresh Gin. It is brewed in Oola's Distillery in Capitol Hill.

=== 1970s and 1980s advertising campaigns ===
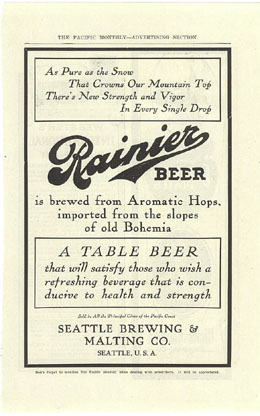
1907 Rainier Beer advertisement

During the 1970s, Rainier ran a number of memorable television ads in the Pacific Northwest, largely conceived by Seattle designer Terry Heckler, assisted by several of his staff, especially Ed Leimbacher, writer/producer for Rainier print, radio and TV for a dozen years. Sound man Joe Hadlock of Bear Creek Studio joined the colleagues of Heckler Bowker for 14 years of creating noise and music for these advertisements.

Some of these surrealist advertisements noted by Seattle Magazine included the Running of the MFRs (Mountain Fresh Rainiers) (a parody of Running of the Bulls featuring bottles with legs), and frogs that croaked "Rainier Beer" (a motif appropriated many years later by Budweiser). Mickey Rooney appeared in several TV ads, most notably a parody of Nelson Eddy and Jeanette MacDonald's "Indian Love Call" from the 1936 MGM film Rose Marie. Mickey was dressed in a Mountie costume alongside his wife Jan as they sang. (Most airings of this commercial ended with Rooney pouring a bottle of Rainier into her proffered glass, but occasionally a version was aired in which he poured the beer into her cleavage.) A commercial ad featured a motorcycle that revved "Raiiiiiiiii-nieeeeeeeer-Beeeeeeeer" while zooming by along a mountain road was notable in the late 1970s and early 1980s. A version of this commercial that played on radio featured the sounds of different brands of motorcycles making the "Rainier Beer" revving sound.

Other ads featured a Lawrence Welk double (played by actor Pat Harrington, Jr.) leading his band in "The Wunnerful Rainier Waltz", complete with bubble machine and soloists blowing on beer bottles; and a performance of a parody of the song "You're the Tops" while thousands of Rainier bottle caps fell like dominoes in a giant "R" frame. (The whole commercial was reportedly shot on the first take, a great relief since it took all day to set up.) Rainier also produced humorous posters such as a "National Beergraphic" parody of a National Geographic Magazine cover depicting tourists encountering an MFR in the forest, and a Flash Gordon/Star Wars poster, "Fresh Wars", that recalled the bar scene in Star Wars: Episode 4. There were even costumed MFRs that made promotional appearances at supermarkets during this period.

Several commercials were parodies of movies, TV shows and famous spokespeople of the time. For example, a couple made references to popular Saturday Night Live skits: one with a Gilda Radner lookalike in her role as Roseanne Roseanneadanna in a Weekend Update skit for Rainier Lite commercial; another had characters called the R-Heads, which was a reference to the Coneheads, with Rainier 'R' logos on the top of their heads. Two commercials featured a Tarzan character where his yell is "Raaaiiinn-iiieeer!". A commercial featured a silhouette of Alfred Hitchcock who would morph into a beer bottle. Another commercial featured a John Houseman imitator when Houseman at the time was a spokesperson for Smith Barney. Another series of commercials featured a Lee Iacocca impersonator walking through stacks of beer cans. One final series of commercials was the Rambo like character called "R-bo", played by Dan Roland. The "R-bo" commercials were filmed in three parts; only two of those commercials aired, however. The third commercial was never seen, because Rainier Brewery was bought out by another brewing company which did not choose to continue the campaign.

=== Decline and sale and modern growth ===
In 1977, the Rainier brewery was sold to G. Heileman Brewing Company, and passed through several more hands before finally winding up owned by Pabst, which closed the Rainier brewery in 1999. The Rainier brand was sold to General Brewing Company, which moved production to the Olympia brewery in nearby Tumwater, Washington. The Olympia Brewing Company closed in 2003. Rainier Beer is now brewed by Pabst in Irwindale, California.

Rainier has experienced significant growth since Pabst purchased the brand in 1999. In 2024, Rainier delivered more beer to retailers than any prior year since the acquisition and the brand's popularity continues to soar. In 2025, Rainier share growth topped all other regional domestic lagers in the country.

In Canada, Rainier is completely independent of the Rainier brand owned by Pabst in the USA, despite similar packaging. Sleeman Breweries of Guelph, Ontario, a division of Sapporo Breweries, acquired Stroh Canada in 1999, which owned the Canadian rights to a folio of brands, including Rainier. Sleeman then became the Canadian manufacturer and distributor.

=== Awards ===
In 1987, Rainier was awarded a silver medal by the Great American Beer Festival in the category of Best American Light Lager. The GABF recognized Rainier again in 1990, 1998, and 2000 with the gold medal for Best American-Style Lager as well as silver medals in the same category in 2003 and 2005. Both Rainier Light and Rainier Ice have received medals, in their respective categories, from the GABF.

== Rainier "R" logo ==
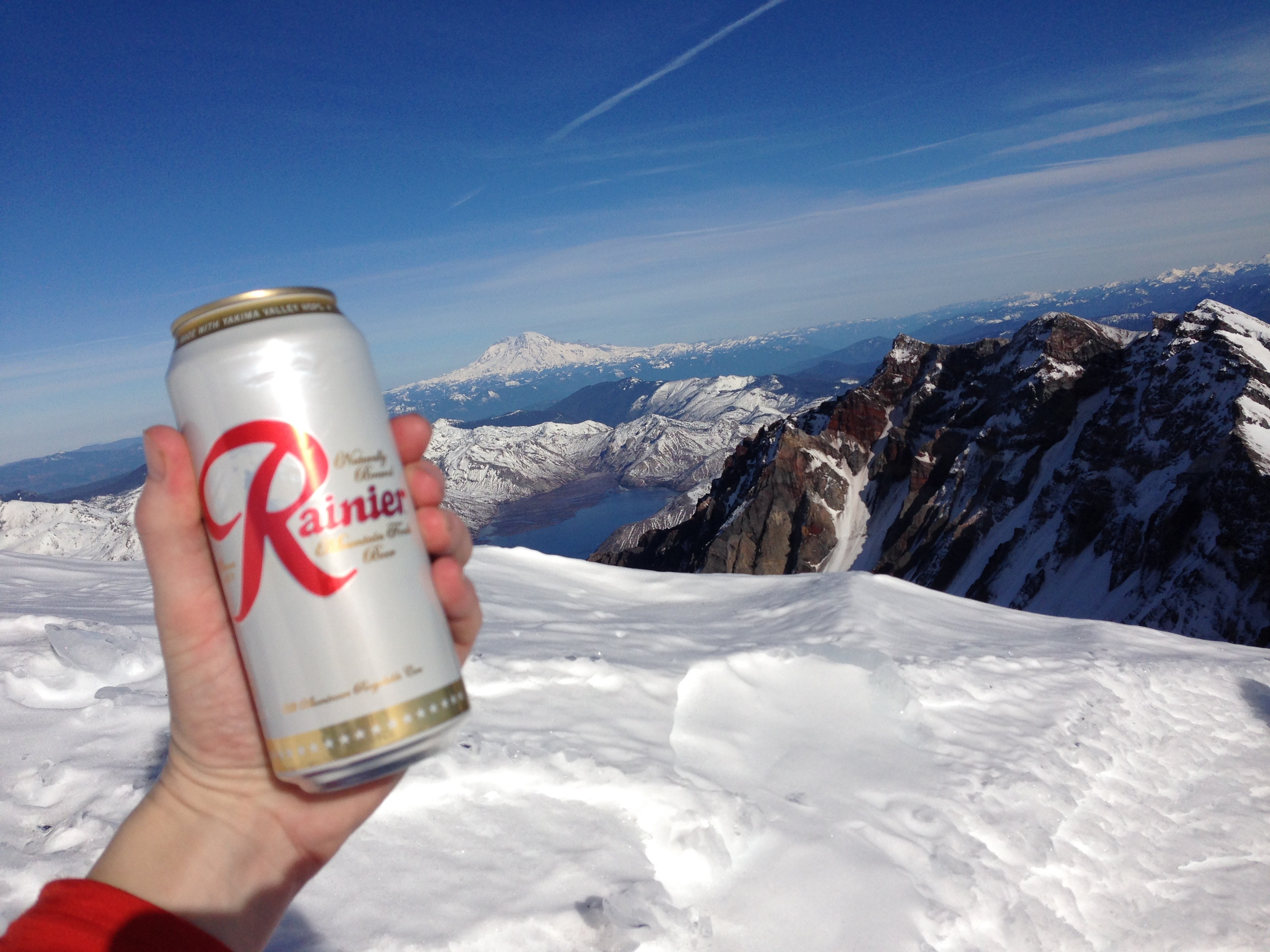
Rainier Beer on Washington State's Mount St. Helens with Mount Rainier in the background

The red Rainier "R" logo has become an icon of the Rainier Brewing Company, dating back to the 1900s. The logo has gone through a few redesigns, having adopted the current "R" logo since the 1950s. Before that, the logo contained baseball style word mark with the "R" logo, shown in early 1900s advertisements up until the 1950s. After that, the word mark changed to go with the revised "R" logo, and it is still being used today. In 1953, a large red neon "R" logo sign was created and placed atop the brewery. After Tully's leased the brewery in 2000, they replaced the iconic "R" with a green neon Tully's "T" sign. The original red "R" sign was sold to the Museum of History & Industry (MOHAI), in which it is now on display at its new location at South Lake Union, Seattle. On September 18, 2013, Tully's (under new owners) decided to replace the green "T" with a replica of the red "R" sign. The green "T" sign was removed on September 30, 2013, and the new red "R" sign was installed on October 24, 2013. The replica "R" sign is different from the original "R" sign; along with the new "R" having lights on both sides, the new sign is made of lighter aluminium, and it has LED lights, requiring them to only replace the lights every five to seven years.

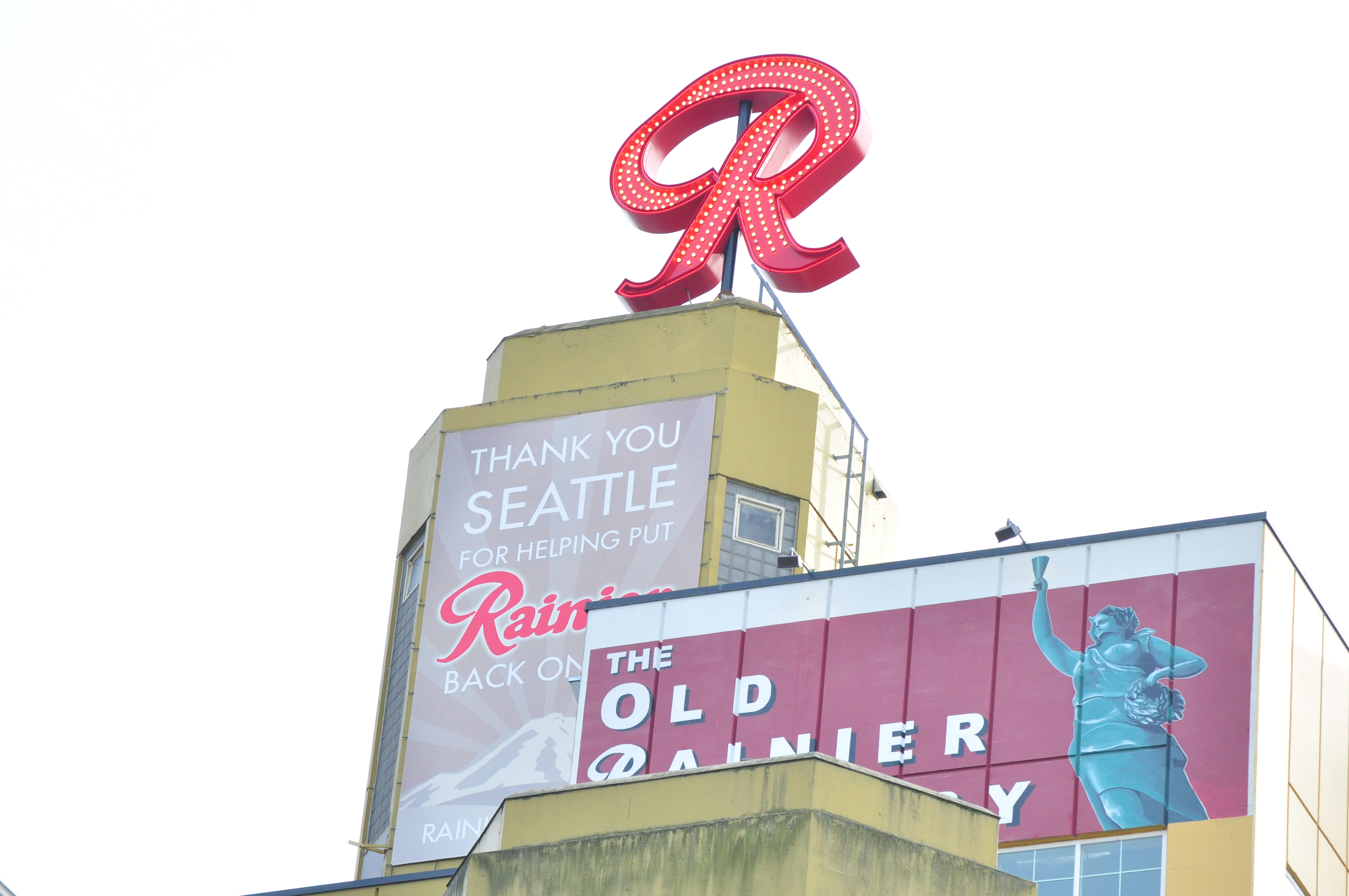
Rainier Brewery with the R restored in November 2013

== In popular culture ==
- In the 1986 film Stand By Me, Ace Merrill (Kiefer Sutherland) and his friends drink Rainier beer while playing mailbox baseball.
- In the 1995 film The Bridges of Madison County, Robert ( Clint Eastwood) drinks Rainier Beer at Francesca's (Meryl Streep) kitchen table.
- The Seattle grunge group Mudhoney was humorously photographed in 1988 with cans of Rainier Beer. The image can be seen on the inside CD cover of the band's Superfuzz Bigmuff + Early Singles release.
- In the 2008 film Twilight, set in Forks, Washington, Rainier beer appears prominently in several scenes, and is referred to as "Vitamin R". Character Charlie Swan is seen drinking the beer in subsequent films in the Twilight series.
- In 2004, a black bear received substantial media attention for having consumed 36 cans of Rainier beer in Baker Lake, Washington. After gaining access to a cooler of beer that belonged to campers, the bear avoided cans of Busch beer and used its claws and teeth to open and then consume the cans of Rainier. A wildlife agent said at the time that "this is a new one on me ... I've known them to get into cans, but nothing like this. And it definitely had a preference."
- In the A&E 2012 television series Longmire, the series' main character Sheriff Walt Longmire exclusively drinks Rainier beer, and can be seen drinking it throughout the series. In the pilot episode, a colleague accuses Longmire of drunk driving after empty beer cans are found in his car; Longmire explains the presence of the empty beer cans by saying "Every man who's ever had a beer with me will tell you the same thing—I drink Rainier, always have, always will. Those beer cans, they weren't Rainier, none of them. I picked 'em up because I hate looking at litter. Everyone knows that, too." In the third episode of season four, a person tries to frame Longmire for a crime by leaving an empty can of Rainier at the scene.
- The beer reached No. 1 on the list of top 100 beers by Cold Cans.
- A pack of Rainier features in the cover photo of the Zach Bryan album Elisabeth from the song of the same name.

== See also ==
- Lady Rainier
- List of defunct breweries in the United States
