= 2005 in art =

The year 2005 in art involved various significant events.

== Events ==
- June – Zentrum Paul Klee, a museum dedicated to Paul Klee, designed by Renzo Piano, opens in Bern, Switzerland.
- September 30 – Controversial drawings of Muhammad are printed in the Danish newspaper Jyllands-Posten.
- Museum of Art Fakes opens in Vienna.
- Banksy's Peckham Rock is installed surreptitiously in the British Museum (London) where it goes undetected for at least 3 days.

== Awards ==
- Archibald Prize – John Olsen, Self portrait Janus Faced
- Beck's Futures – Christina Mackie
- Caldecott Medal for children's book illustration – Kevin Henkes, Kitten's First Full Moon
- Rolf Schock Prize in Visual Arts – Kazuyo Sejima and Ryue Nishizawa
- Turner Prize – Simon Starling, Shedboatshed
- The Venice Biennial (June 12 – November 6):
  - Lion d'Or Golden Lion for Lifetime Achievement: Barbara Kruger (USA)
  - Lion d'Or for Best Pavilion: Annette Messager (France)
- Wynne prize – Jenny Sages, The Road to Utopia

== Works ==
- February 12–27 – The Gates, installation art by Christo and Jeanne-Claude in Central Park, New York City.
- May 10 – Dedication of Memorial to the Murdered Jews of Europe, designed by architect Peter Eisenman originally working with sculptor Richard Serra (both Americans), in Berlin.
- July 9 – Unveiling of Monument to the Women of World War II, sculpted by John W. Mills, in Whitehall, London.
- John Aiken – Monolith and Shadow (sculpture outside University College Hospital, London)
- Banksy – Crude Oil (Vettriano)
- Louise Bourgeois – Father and Son (sculpture in Seattle)
- Herbert Dreiseitl – Artwall (installation art in Portland, Oregon)
- Elmgreen & Dragset – Prada Marfa in Marfa, Texas
- Barry Flanagan – Pirate's Wheel
- Kennardphilips - Photo Op, photomontage of Tony Blair in front of burning oil
- Damian Loeb – "Straw Dogs"
- Roy McMakin
  - Love & Loss (installation art in Seattle)
  - Untitled (Wooden Toilet)
- Ron Mueck – In Bed (sculpture in Queensland Gallery of Modern Art)
- Odd Nerdrum – Cannibals
- Dennis Oppenheim – Engagement (sculptures)
- Bridget Riley – Red Movement
- Nelson Shanks – Bill Clinton (for the National Portrait Gallery in Washington D.C.
- Joel Shapiro – 20 Elements

== Exhibitions ==
- Aleksander Balos – Travaux récents (organised by Arts nord sud, at Espace Griffon, Crédit Municipal, Paris, France)

== Deaths ==
=== January to March ===
- 1 January – Eugene J. Martin, American visual artist (born 1938)
- 2 January – Frank Kelly Freas, American illustrator and painter (born 1922)
- 4 January
  - Guy Davenport, American writer, translator, illustrator, painter, intellectual and teacher (born 1927)
  - Alton Tobey, American painter, historical artist, muralist, portraitist, illustrator and teacher (born 1914)
- 14 January
  - Conroy Maddox, English surrealist painter, collagist, writer and lecturer (b.1912)
  - Rudolph Moshammer, German fashion designer (born 1940; murdered)
- 25 January
  - Philip Johnson, American major art collector, MoMA curator, influential architect (born 1906)
  - Max Velthuijs, Dutch painter, illustrator and author (born 1923)
- 27 January
  - Gordon Lambert, Irish art collector (born 1919)
  - Aurélie Nemours, French painter (born 1910)
- 7 February – Paul Rebeyrolle, French painter (born 1926)
- 18 February – Harald Szeemann, Swiss curator and art historian (born 1933)
- 21 February – Zdzisław Beksiński, Polish painter, photographer, and fantasy artist (born 1929)
- 15 March – Judith Scott, American outsider fiber sculptor (born 1943)
- 20 March – Walter Hopps, American museum director and curator (born 1932)

=== April to June ===
- 5 April
  - Dale Messick, first American woman syndicated comic strip artist (b.1906)
  - Neil Welliver, American painter (b.1929)
- 10 April – Carl Abrahams, Jamaican painter (b.1911)
- 11 April – André François, French cartoonist (b.1915)
- 13 April
  - Philip Pavia, American sculptor (b.1912)
  - Juan Zanotto, Italian-born Argentine comic book artist (b.1935)
- 19 April – Clement Meadmore, Australian-born American sculptor (b.1929)
- 22 April – Eduardo Paolozzi, Scottish-born sculptor and artist (b.1924)
- 27 May
  - Astrid Zydower, German-born British sculptor (b.1930)
  - Fay Godwin, English landscape photographer (b.1931)
- 12 June – David Whitney, American independent curator and art dealer (b.1939)
- 21 June – Al Loving, African American abstract impressionist painter (b.1935)

=== July to December ===
- 22 July – Dragoš Kalajić, Serbian painter (born 1943)
- 26 July – Robert C. Turner, American potter (b.1913)
- 27 July – Al Held, American Abstract expressionist painter (b.1928)
- 1 August – Constant Nieuwenhuys, Dutch painter, one of the innovators of Unitary Urbanism (b.1920)
- 16 August – Joe Ranft, American magician, animation storyboard artist and voice actor (b.1960)
- 22 August – Juliet Pannett, English portrait artist (born 1911)
- 26 August – Robert Denning, American interior designer (b.1927)
- 22 October – Arman, French-born American artist (b.1928)
- 28 October – Raymond Hains, French artist and photographer (b.1926)
- 11 November – Patrick Anson, 5th Earl of Lichfield, English photographer (b.1939)
- 2 December – Lillian Browse, English art dealer and historian (born 1906)
- 31 December – Aiko Suzuki, Canadian textile and visual artist (born 1937)

== See also ==
- List of years in art
