= Love & Loss =

Sculpture in Seattle, Washington, U.S.

- Part of the installation in 2024
- Artist: Roy McMakin
- Year: 2005
- Location: Olympic Sculpture Park (Seattle Art Museum); Seattle, Washington; 47°36′59.73″N 122°21′34.21″W

Love & Loss is an outdoor 2005 mixed-media installation by Roy McMakin, installed at Olympic Sculpture Park in Seattle, Washington.

== Description ==
The Seattle Times and the Seattle Post-Intelligencer said the work is multifaceted and interactive, respectively. According to The Stranger, "The piece consists of cast concrete benches, a sidewalk-like pathway, a small, circular reflecting pool, and a double-trunked crabapple tree that spell out the words 'love' and 'loss.' Jutting up from the middle is a red neon ampersand." The ampersand revolves.

Brangien Davis of Crosscut.com described the artwork as a "sculpture slash word puzzle".

== Reception ==
Arts Observer called the work "clever".

== See also ==
- 2005 in art
