= Untitled (McMakin) =

Sculpture in Seattle, Washington, U.S.

- The sculpture in 2024
- Artist: Roy McMakin
- Type: Sculpture
- Medium: Cast concrete
- Location: Olympic Sculpture Park (Seattle Art Museum); Seattle, Washington; 47°36′59″N 122°21′19″W

Untitled, also known as Bench, is an outdoor 2004–2007 Roy McMakin sculpture by Roy McMakin, installed at Olympic Sculpture Park in Seattle, Washington.
