= The Racket =

The Racket may refer to:

== Film, television and theatre ==
- The Racket (play), a 1927 Broadway crime play by Bartlett Cormack
- The Racket (1928 film), an American adaptation of the play, directed by Lewis Milestone
- The Racket (1951 film), an American remake of the 1928 film, starring Robert Mitchum
- "The Racket" (Vinyl), a 2016 TV episode

== Other uses ==
- The Racket (book), a 2015 book by Matthew Kennard
- The Racket (radio program), an Australian heavy metal program

== See also ==
- Racket (disambiguation)
