= Racket =

Racket may refer to:

- Racket (crime), a systematised element of organized crime
  - Protection racket, a scheme whereby a group provides protection to businesses or other groups through violence outside the sanction of the law
- Racket (sports equipment), a piece of equipment used to play tennis, badminton, squash, racquetball and other racket sports
  - Rackets (sport), a particular sports discipline related to squash played indoors in the United Kingdom, Republic of Ireland, United States, and Canada.
- Racket (programming language), a general-purpose, multi-paradigm programming language based on the Scheme dialect of Lisp
- Racket, West Virginia, an unincorporated community in Gilmer and Ritchie counties
- The Racket (1951 film), a black & white film noir starring Robert Mitchum
- Racket (film), a 1997 film with Michele Placido, Tanya Roberts and Franco Interlenghi
- Racket (album), a 2007 album by Whitehouse
- Racket (Minnesota), an alternative news site in Minnesota
- Racket (TV series), an Australian music TV series
- The Racket (disambiguation)

== See also ==
- Racket Squad
- Rackett, a Renaissance woodwind instrument
- Radne Raket 120, a lightweight single cylinder, two-stroke aircraft engine
