= Mary's Invitation – A Place to Regard Beauty =

2014 sculpture by Ginny Ruffner

- The sculpture in 2024
- Artist: Ginny Ruffner
- Year: 2014
- Location: Seattle, Washington, U.S.
- 47°37′0.7″N 122°21′20.1″W

Mary's Invitation – A Place to Regard Beauty is a 2014 sculpture by Ginny Ruffner, installed at Seattle's Olympic Sculpture Park, in the U.S. state of Washington.
