= Olympic Sculpture Park =

Public park in Seattle, Washington

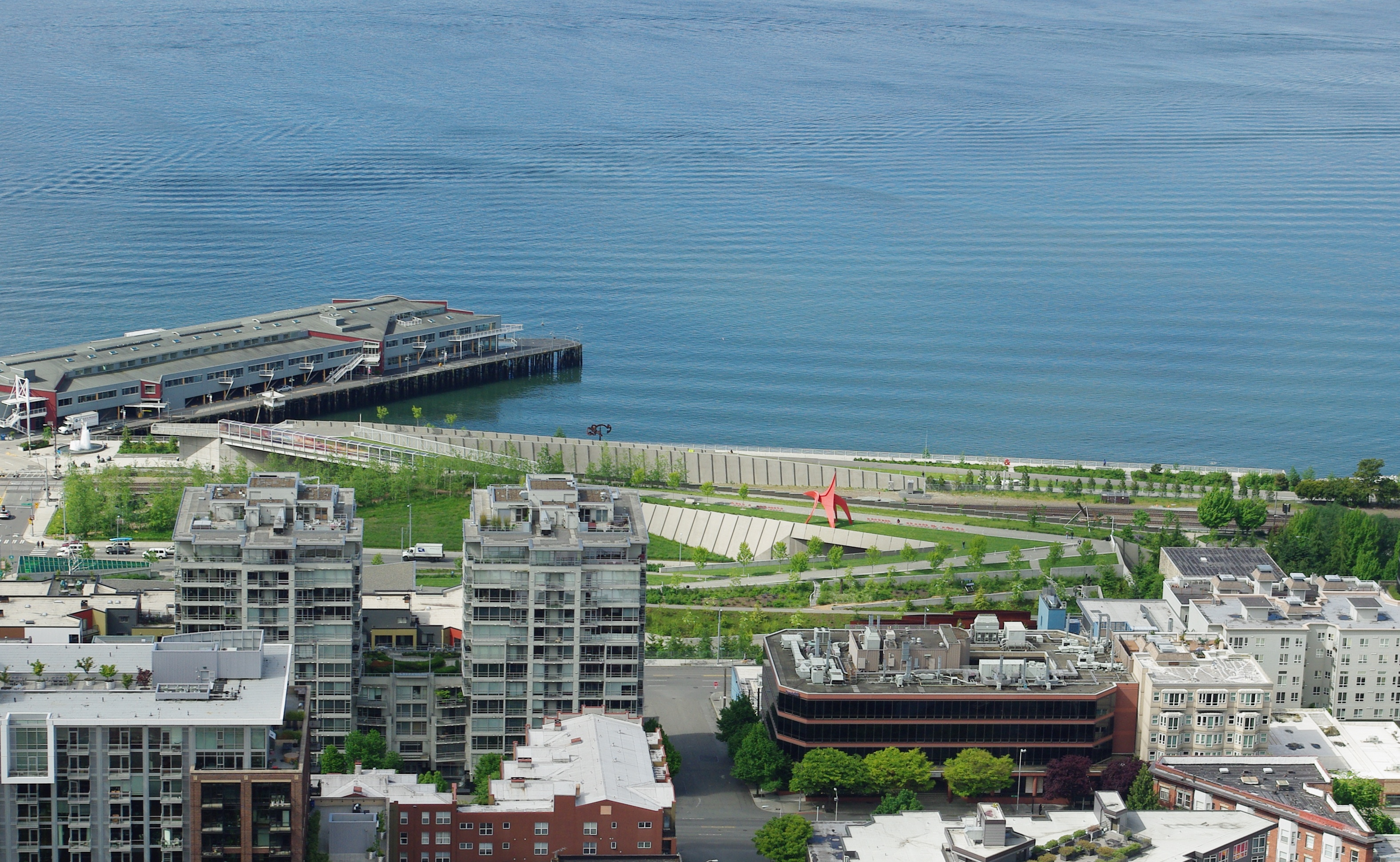
- The park as viewed from the Space Needle
- Interactive map of Olympic Sculpture Park
- Type: Sculpture park
- Location: 2901 Western Avenue; Seattle, Washington, U.S.
- Coordinates: 47°36′59″N 122°21′19″W
- Area: 8.5 acres (3.4 ha)
- Founder: Mary and Jon Shirley
- Designer: Weiss/Manfredi
- Operator: Seattle Art Museum
- Open: January 20, 2007
- Other information: Open sunrise to sunset
- Website: official website

The Olympic Sculpture Park, created and operated by the Seattle Art Museum (SAM), is a public park with modern and contemporary sculpture in downtown Seattle, Washington, United States. The park, which opened January 20, 2007, consists of a 9-acre (36,000 m^{2}) outdoor sculpture museum, an indoor pavilion, and a beach on Puget Sound. It is situated in Belltown at the northern end of the Central Waterfront and the southern end of Myrtle Edwards Park.

The Olympic Sculpture Park is a free-admission outdoor sculpture park with both permanent outdoor sculpture, temporary works, and site-specific installations. The Seattle Art Museum regularly rotates a major artwork at the Olympic Sculpture Park, including installations by Victoria Haven from 2016 to 2017, Spencer Finch from 2017 to 2019, and Regina Silveira from 2019 to 2020.

== History ==
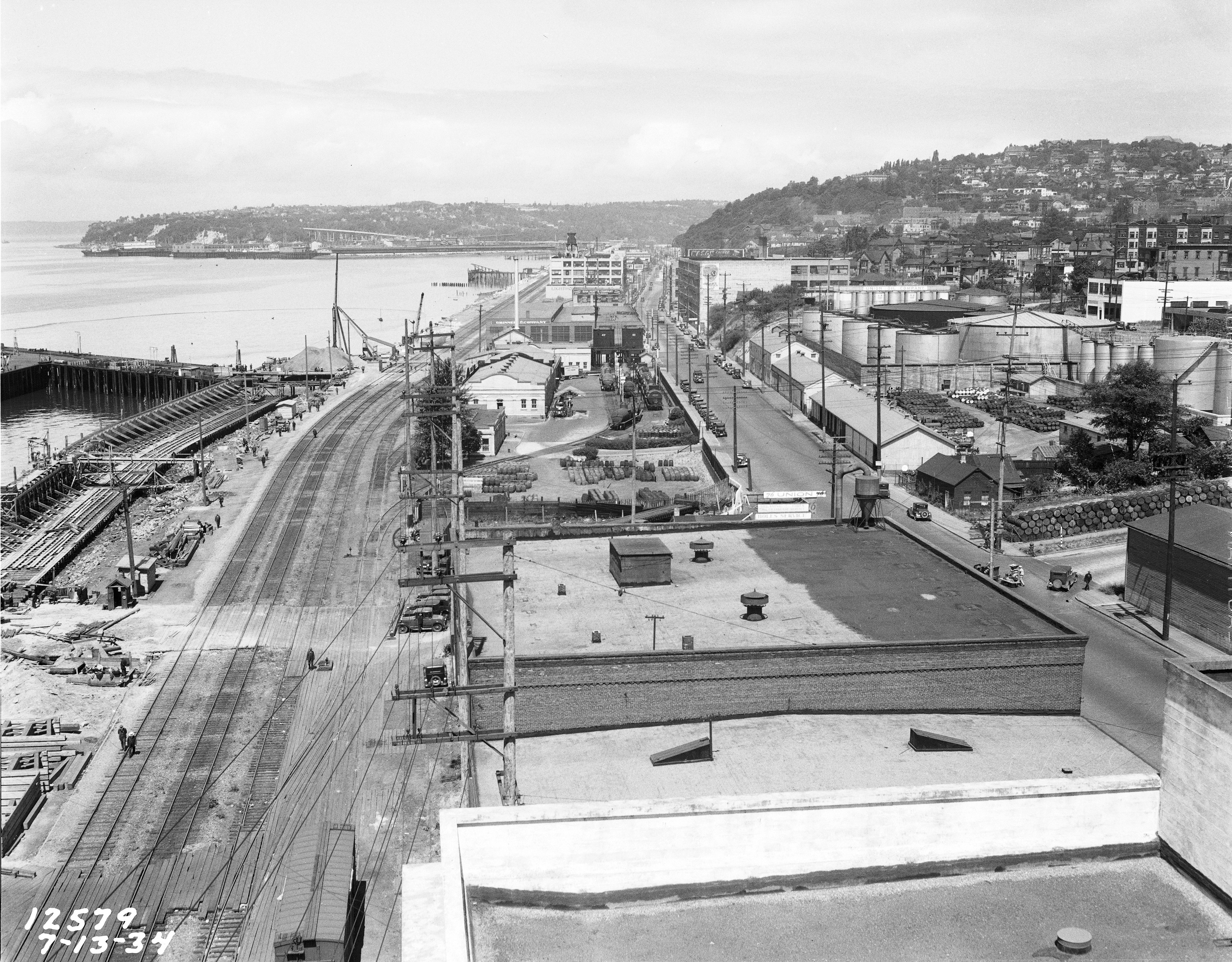
The site in 1934, with oil storage facility at center right; streetcar building to the left.

The former industrial site was occupied by the oil and gas corporation Unocal until the 1970s and subsequently became a contaminated brownfield before the Seattle Art Museum proposed to transform the area into one of the only green spaces in Downtown Seattle. The park's lead designer was Weiss/Manfredi Architects, who collaborated with Charles Anderson Landscape Architecture, Magnusson Klemencic Associates and other consultants.

=== Background ===
The idea of green space for large, monumental sculpture in Seattle was first discussed between Virginia and Bagley Wright, Mary and Jon Shirley (former president of Microsoft and Chairman of the Seattle Art Museum Board of Directors at the time), and then Seattle Art Museum director (and wife of William Gates Sr.) Mimi Gardner Gates. The idea grew further during a discussion in 1996 between Robert Measures, Martha Wyckoff, and Mimi Gardner Gates while stranded on a fly fishing trip in Mongolia due to a helicopter crash. Wyckoff, being a trustee of the Trust for Public Land, soon after began an effort to identify possible locations for the park.

A $30 million gift from Mary and Jon Shirley established them as foundational donors. As part of constructing the sculpture park, $5.7 million was spent transforming 1,000 feet (300 m) of the seawall and underwater shoreline inside Myrtle Edwards park. A three-level underwater slope was built with 50,000 tonnes of riprap. The first level of the slope is large rocks to break up waves. The second is a flat "bench" level to recreate an intertidal zone. The lower level is covered with smaller rocks designed to attract sea life and large kelp. The aim for the recreated strand was to help revitalize juvenile salmon from the Duwamish River and serve as a test site for future efforts.

==== Community concerns ====
Prior to the construction of the park, some community members expressed concern that the Waterfront Streetcar would be shut down, as plans required demolition of the streetcar's maintenance and storage facility, located on a portion of the building site. Although staff offered to modify the carbarn into a sculpture to fit into the park, the building was demolished and the line shut down in November 2005. The streetcar route, named by National Geographic Society as one of the 10 Great Streetcar routes, had been popular with tourists and locals.

=== Other uses ===
A mini golf course at the sculpture park opened in June 2026 for a three-month run. It has nine holes, each designed by artists in various styles, placed around the sculptures.

== Collections ==
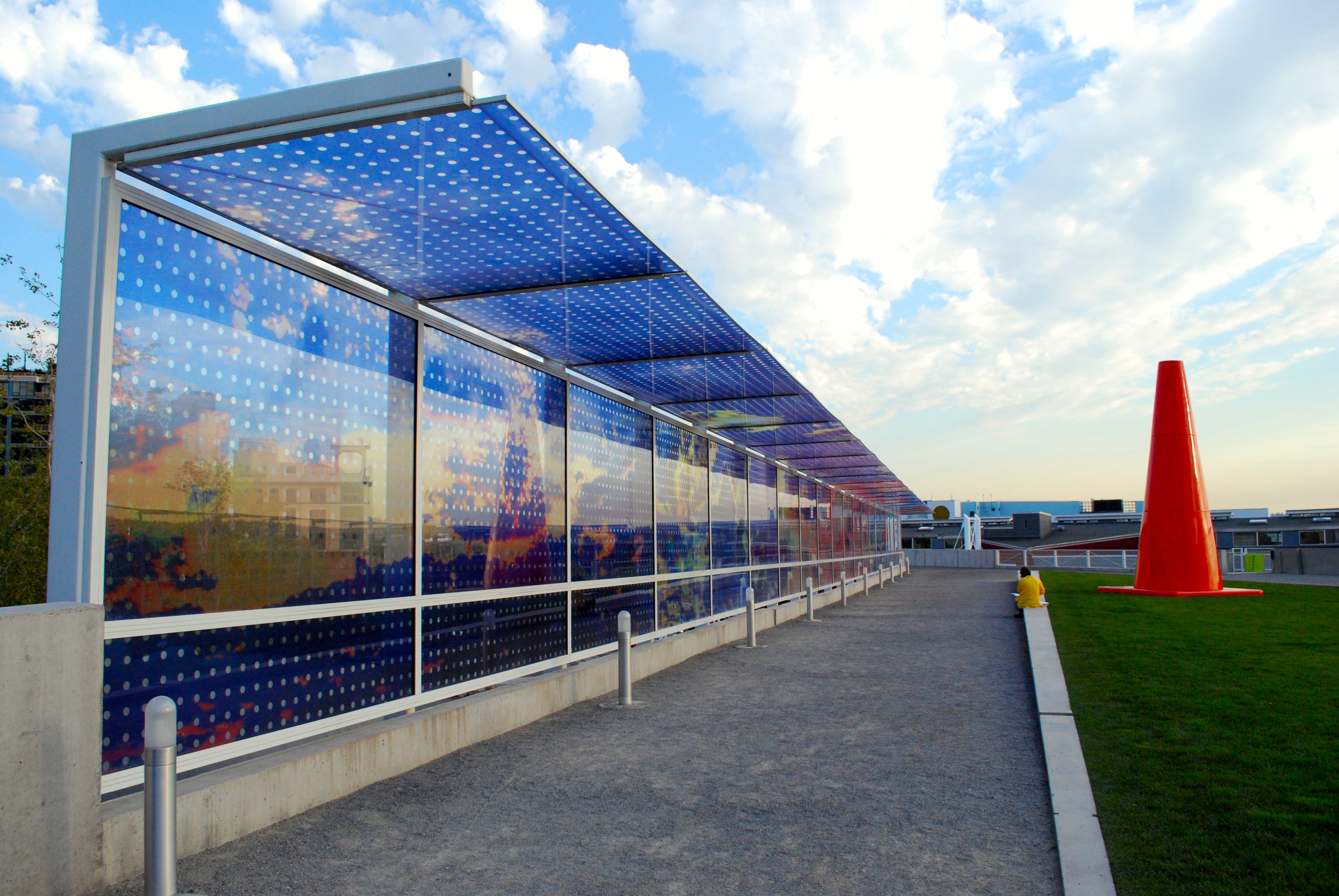
Seattle Cloud Cover

=== Current sculpture ===
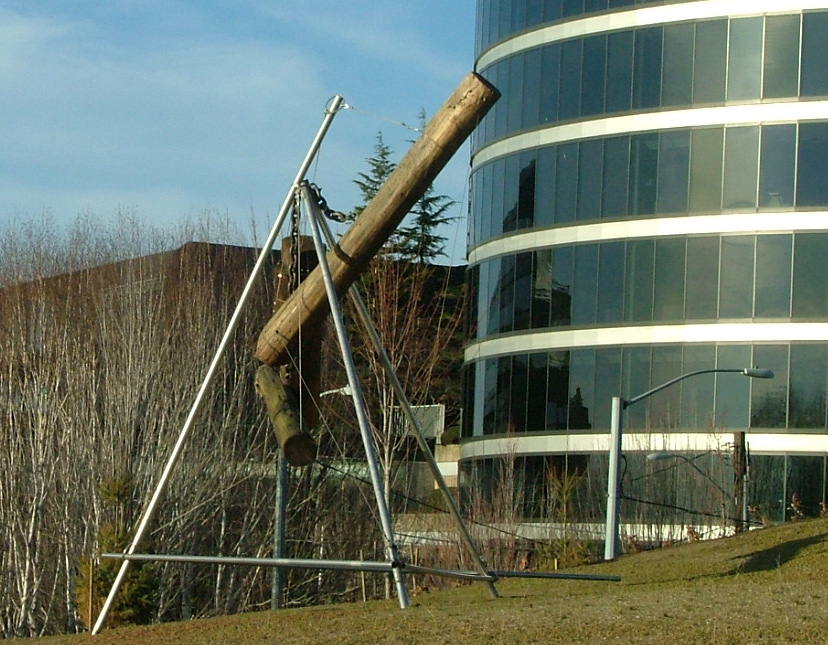
Bunyon's Chess

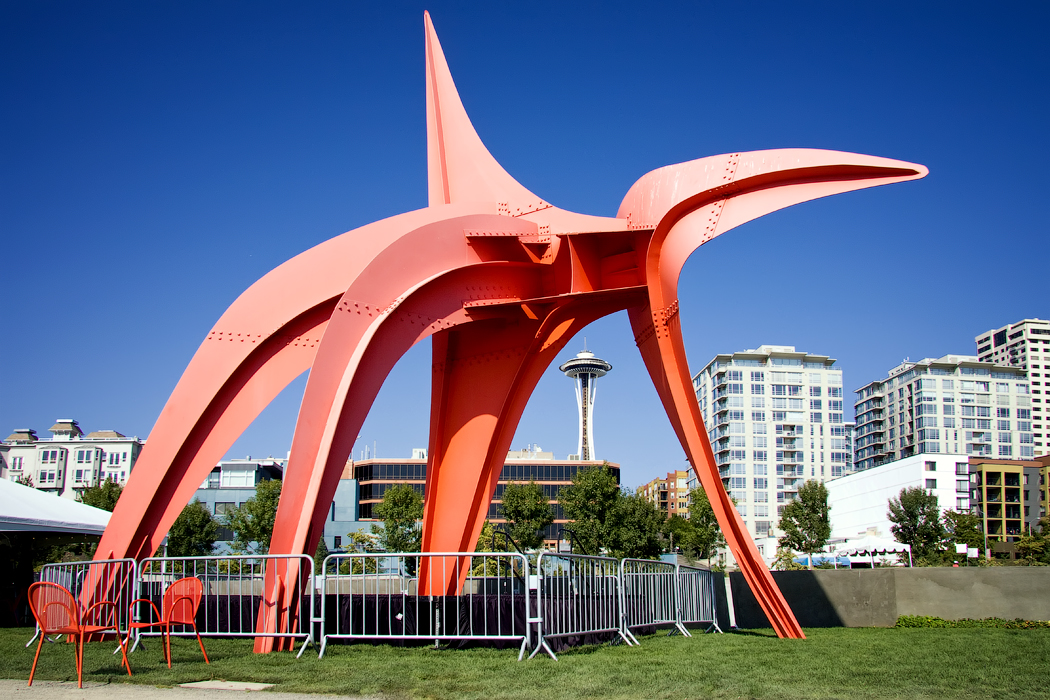
Eagle

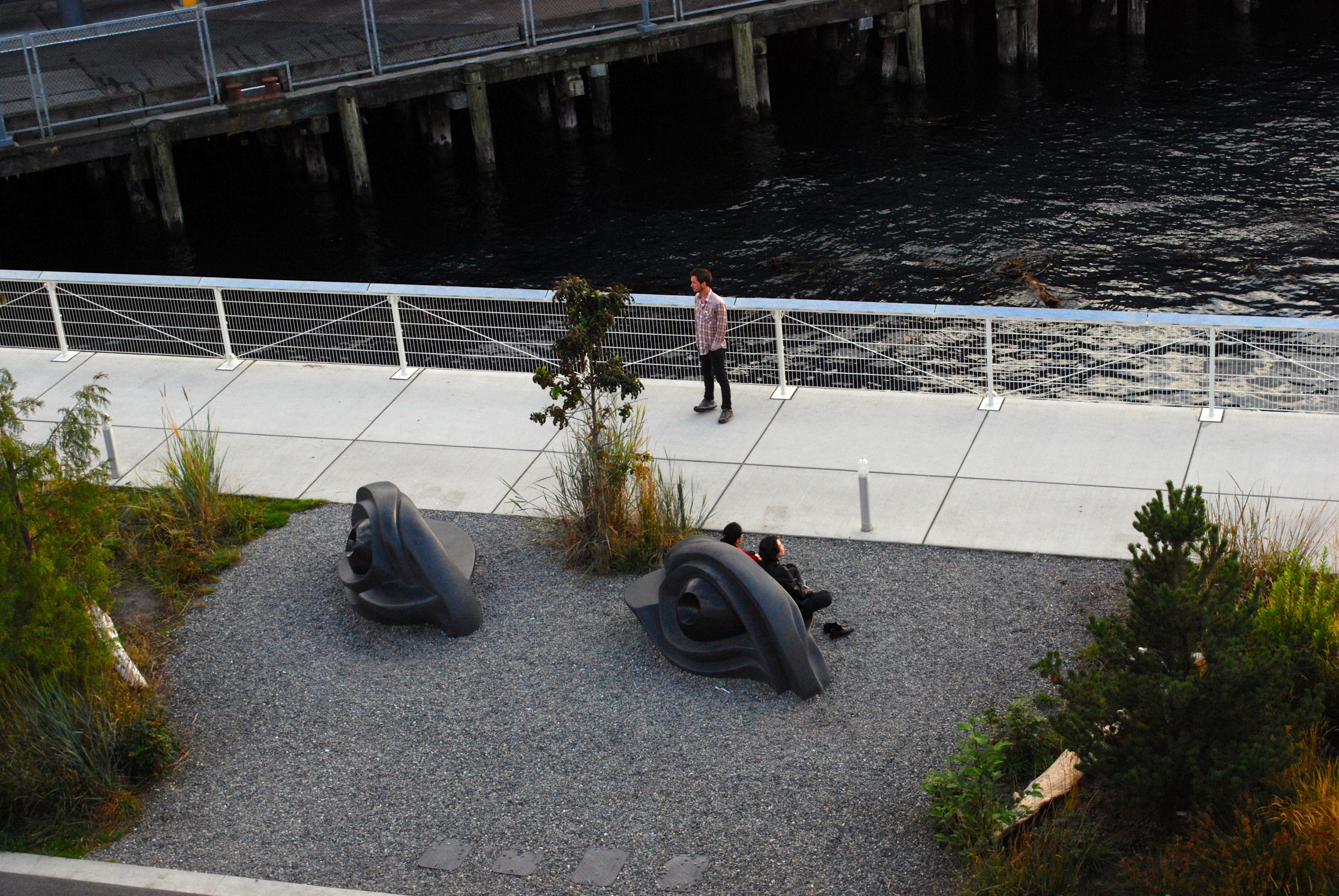
Eye Benches I, II and III

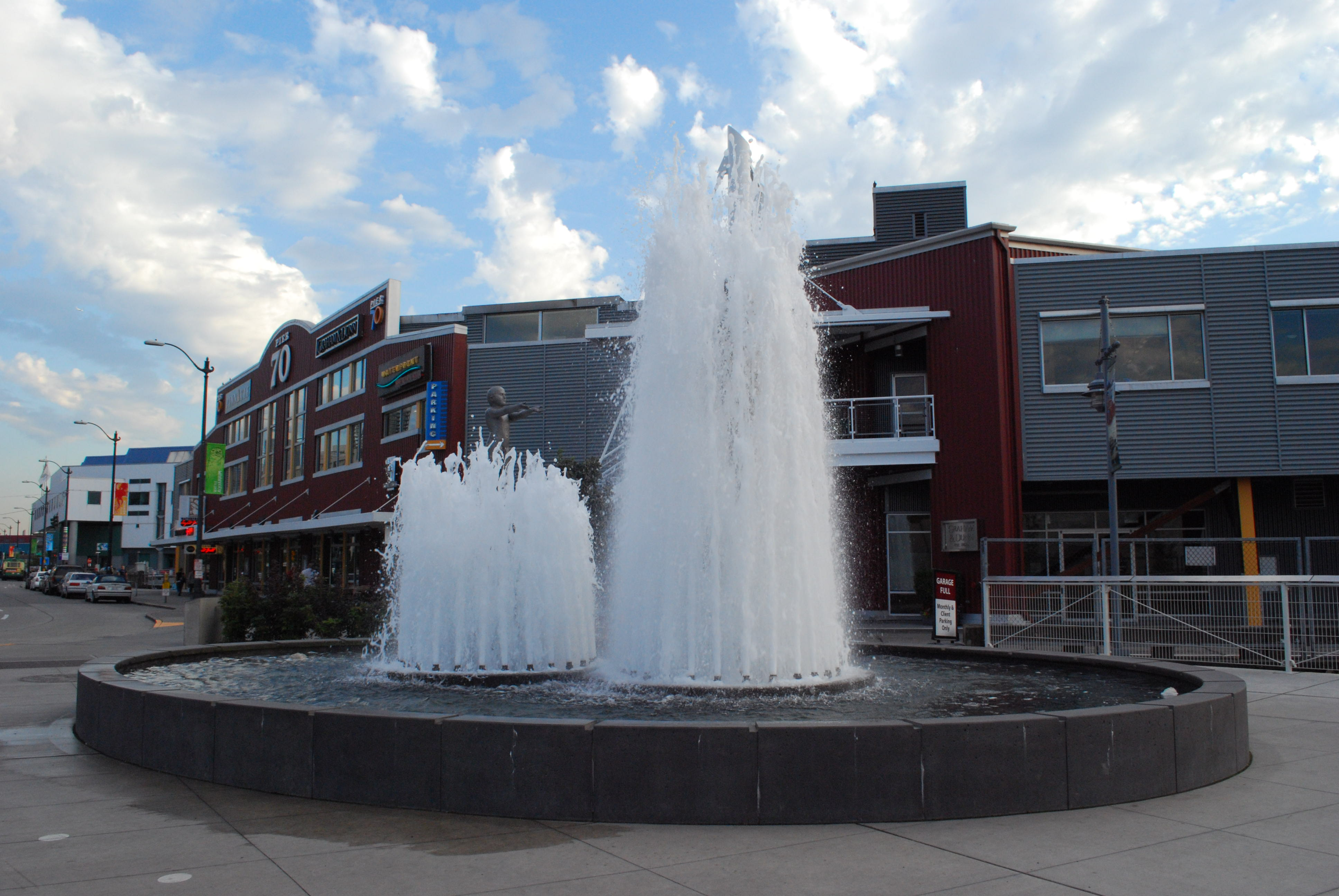
Father and Son

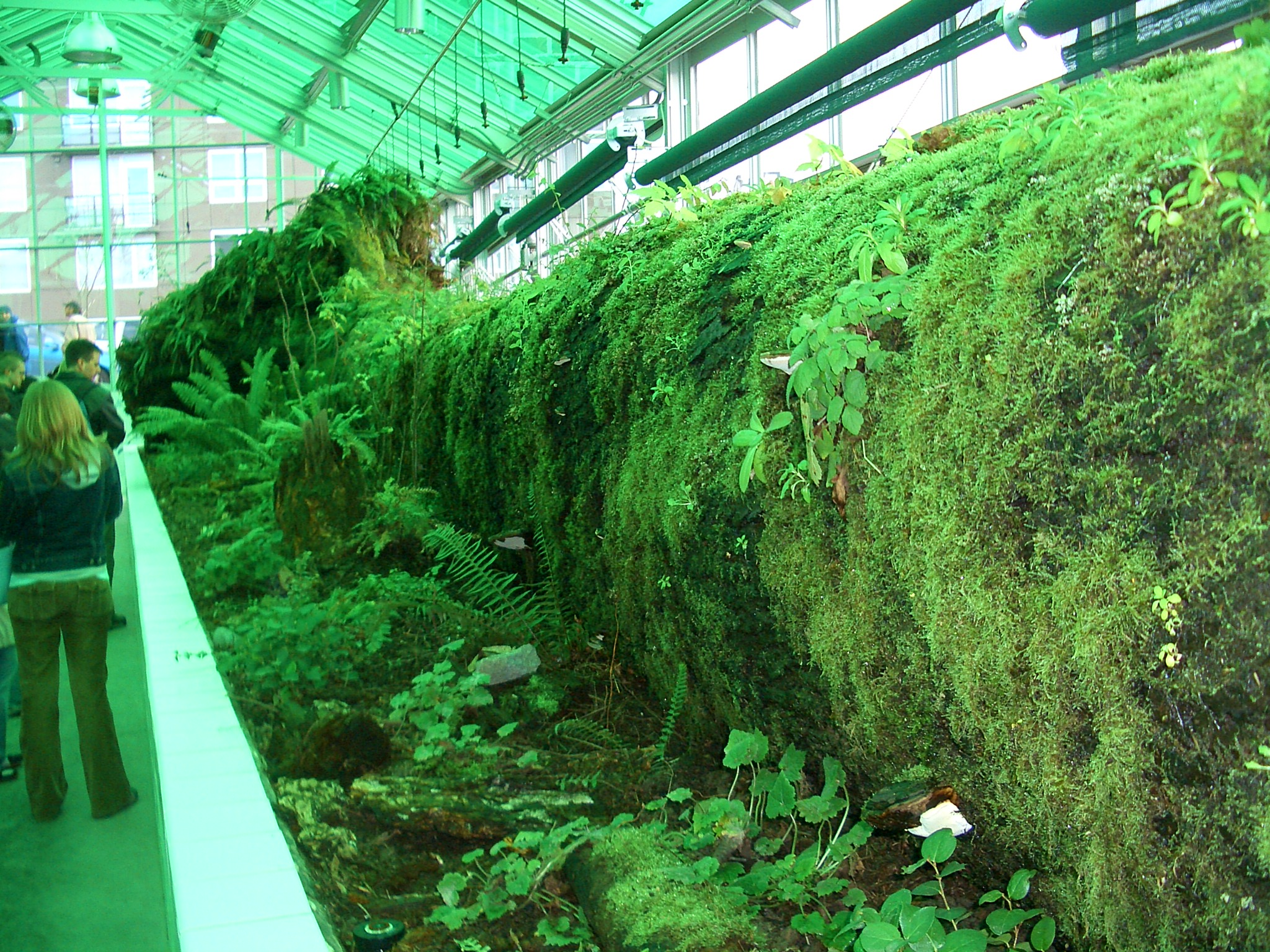
Neukom Vivarium

- Bunyon's Chess (1965), Mark di Suvero
- Curve XXIV (1981), Ellsworth Kelly
- Eagle (1971), Alexander Calder
- Echo (2011), Jaume Plensa
- Eye Benches I, II and III (1996), Louise Bourgeois
- Father and Son (2004–2006), Louise Bourgeois
- Love & Loss (2005), Roy McMakin
- Mary's Invitation – A Place to Regard Beauty (2014), Ginny Ruffner
- Neukom Vivarium (2006), Mark Dion
- Perre's Ventaglio III (1967), Beverly Pepper
- Persephone Unbound (1965), Beverly Pepper
- Schubert Sonata (1992), Mark di Suvero
- Seattle Cloud Cover (2006), Teresita Fernández
- Sky Landscape I (1983), Louise Nevelson
- Split (2003), Roxy Paine
- Stinger (1999), Tony Smith
- Two Plane Vertical Horizontal Variation III (1973), George Rickey
- Untitled (2004–2007), Roy McMakin
- Wake (2004), Richard Serra
- Wandering Rocks (1967), Tony Smith

=== Former works ===
- Riviera (1971–1974) by Anthony Caro
- Typewriter Eraser, Scale X by Claes Oldenburg and Coosje van Bruggen

=== Conservation ===
Maintenance of the sculptures has been an ongoing challenge. Bordering the Puget Sound, a large body of salt water, the park environment has been corrosive to pieces like Bunyon's Chess, made primarily of exposed wood and metal. Conservation work on Bunyon's Chess was completed by the museum in 2018.

The museum has a "no-touch" policy to help preserve the art over time. The policy, instituted by Nicholas Dorman, chief conservator for SAM, aims to protect the pieces from damage, including long-term changes caused by oils left by human contact, of particular concern with Wake by Richard Serra. Wake is made from corten steel which has a delicate patina of rust on the surface that contributes a vivid coloration.

Tall painted pieces such as Eagle need to be watched for damage from birds and their waste. Maintenance of these large structures is expensive, requiring scaffolding or boom lifts. The paint on Eagle is also easily damaged by the mechanical clipping of grass near the base of its installation, requiring the gardeners to use scissors instead of a lawn mower near the sculpture. Eagle underwent conservation in 2020, when the museum oversaw a full overhaul of the surface by restoring the steel artwork with fresh primer and new paint while the work was covered over with a large tarp.

=== Individual works ===
The piece Stinger, by artist Tony Smith was created after his death. The work was conceived by the artist in 1967 in a drawing and first constructed as a plywood mock-up in 1968. The painted steel version at the sculpture park was fabricated in 1999, based on the artist's design, and was donated to the Seattle Art Museum by the artist's estate.

When the park opened in 2007, Typewriter Eraser, Scale X by Claes Oldenburg and Coosje van Bruggen, was on three-year loan from its owner, Microsoft co-founder Paul Allen. The park initially prohibited the public from photographing this sculpture, positioned alongside Elliott Avenue, but eventually lifted the prohibition. Typewriter Eraser, Scale X moved to Seattle Center in 2016.

== Reception ==
=== Public reception ===
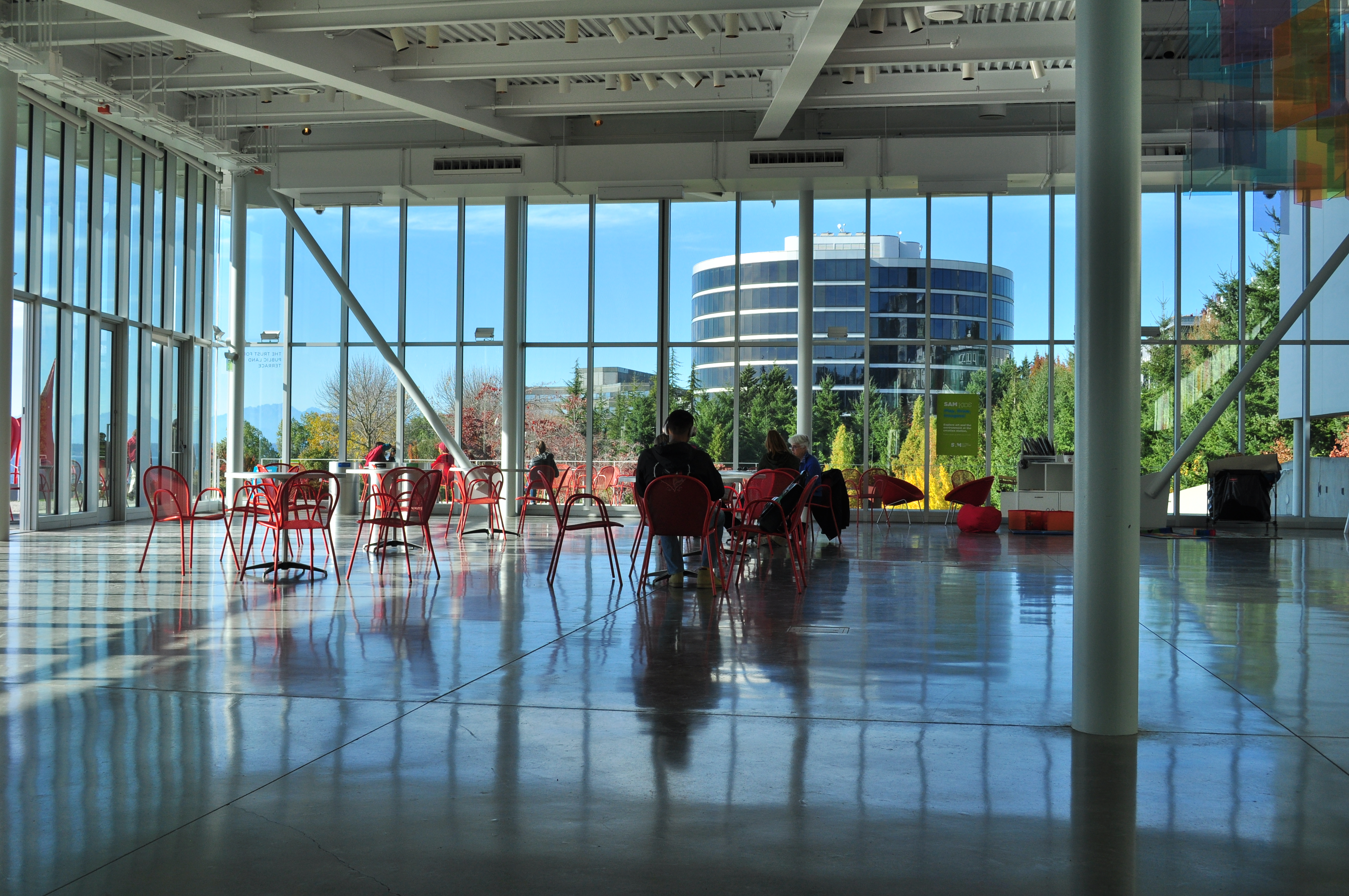
indoor pavilion at the Olympic Sculpture Park in 2017

Prior to and during the park's opening in 2007, the project received positive reviews from many regional and national press sources, and the Olympic Sculpture Park has now become an icon for Seattle. Frommer's guide calls it "the best thing to happen to Seattle in years."

Each year the Olympic Sculpture Park (free to the public) welcomes hundreds of thousands of visitors, according to the Seattle Art Museum's annual report. In 2018, Artsy named the park one of the "World's Greatest Sculpture Parks."

=== Awards ===
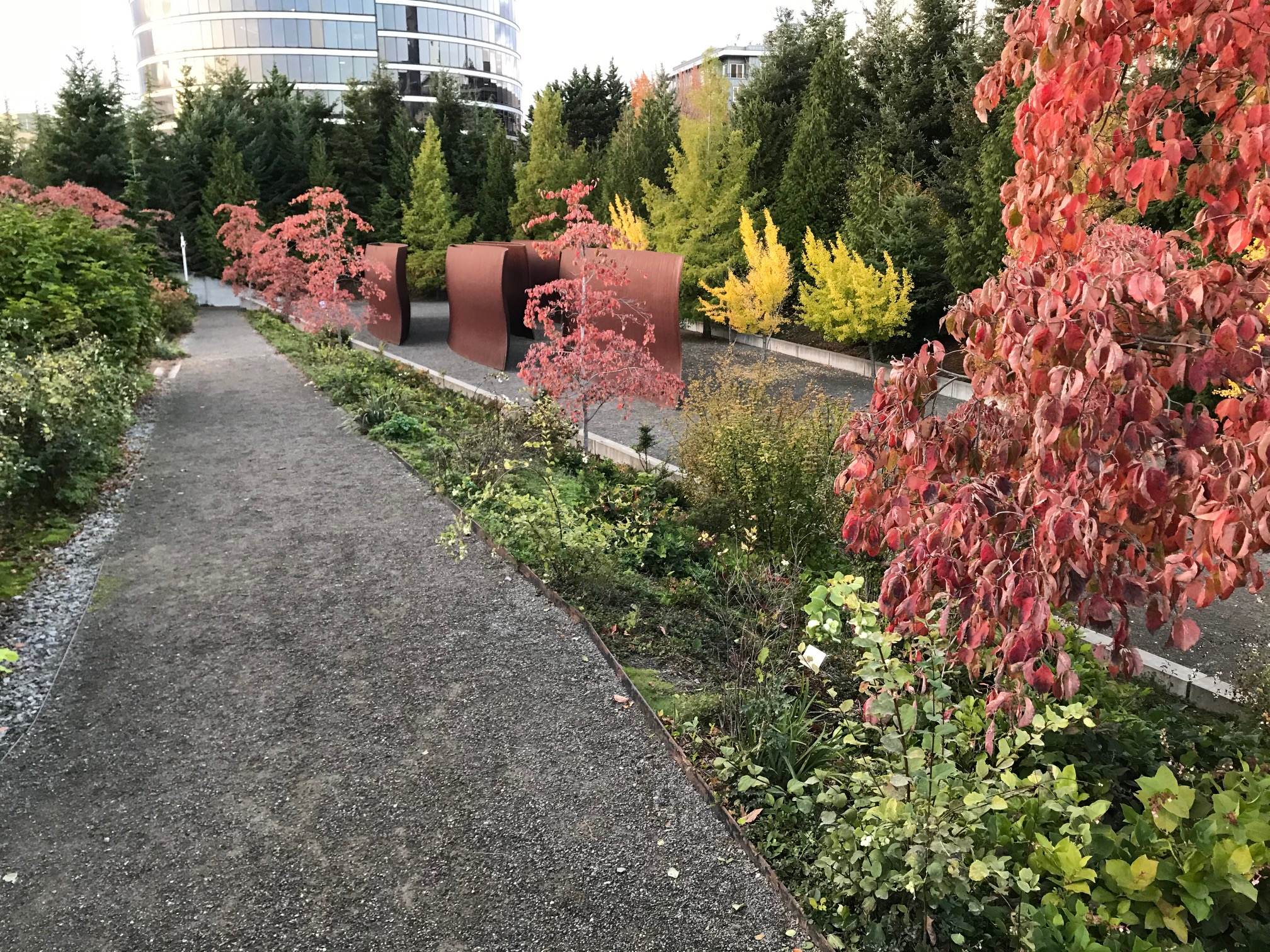
Olympic Sculpture Park in 2020

The park received the following awards in 2007:

- Harvard University's Graduate School of Design, the Veronica Rudge Green Prize in Urban Design
- American Institute of Architects, Seattle Chapter, the Allied Organization Award
- American Institute of Architects, New York Chapter, Design Awards: Architecture Honor Award
- American Society of Landscape Architects (ASLA), Professional Awards: General Design Honor Award (Lead Designer: Weiss/Manfredi, Landscape Architect: Charles Anderson Landscape Architecture)

The park received the following awards in 2008:

- World Architecture Festival Nature Category Award
- The Chicago Athenaeum: Museum of Architecture and Design American Architecture Award
- Travel + Leisure Design Award for best cultural space
- American Shore and Beach Preservation Association, Top Restored Beach Award
