= Schubert Sonata =

Sculpture in Seattle, Washington, U.S.

- The sculpture in 2022
- Artist: Mark di Suvero
- Year: 1992
- Type: Sculpture
- Medium: Painted steel
- Location: Olympic Sculpture Park (Seattle Art Museum); Seattle, Washington; 47°36′56.6″N 122°21′23.0″W

Schubert Sonata is an outdoor 1992 partially painted steel sculpture by Mark di Suvero, installed at Olympic Sculpture Park in Seattle, Washington.

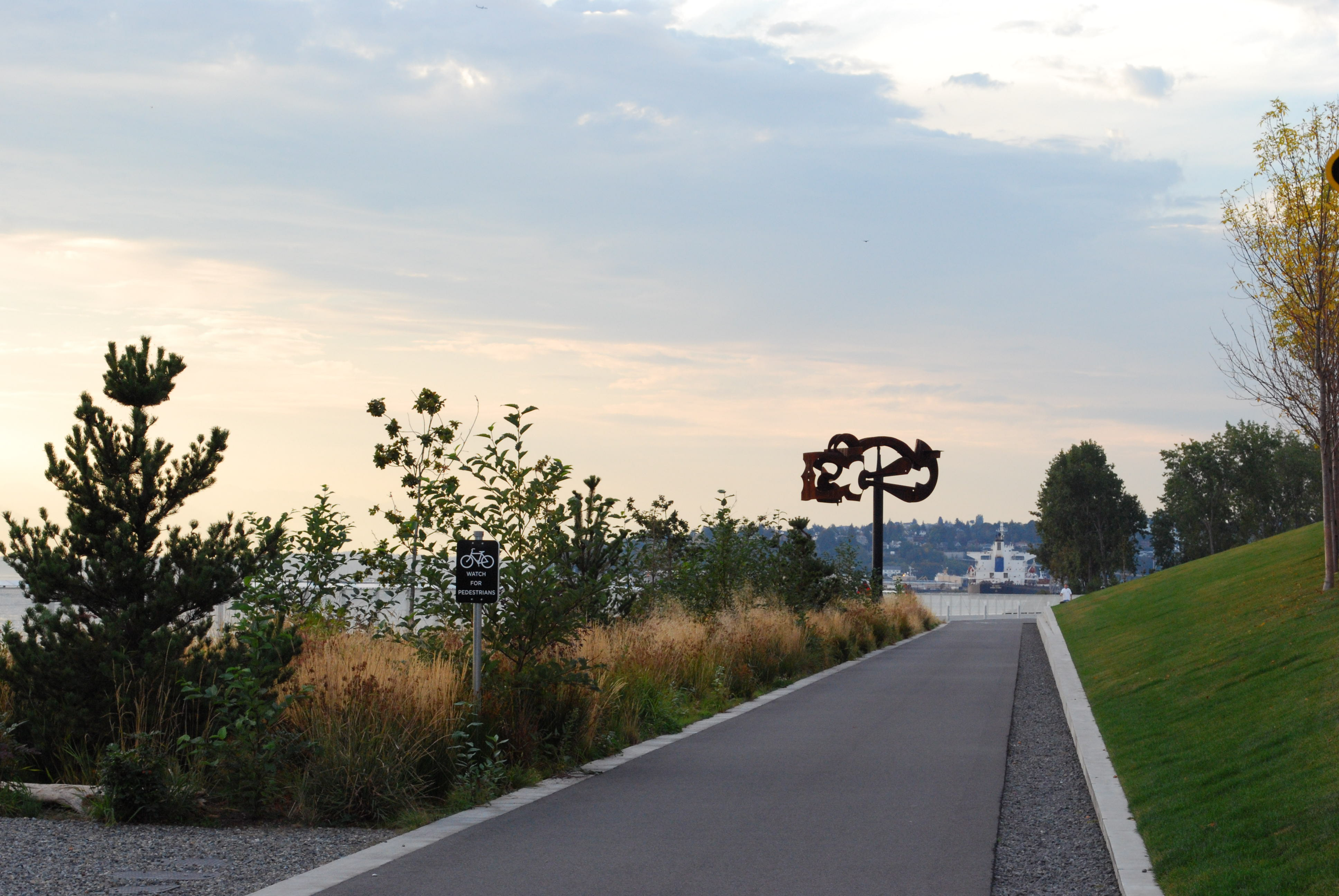

== See also ==
- 1992 in art
