= Hans Godo Frabel =

Hans Godo Frabel behind the torch. Atlanta, GA

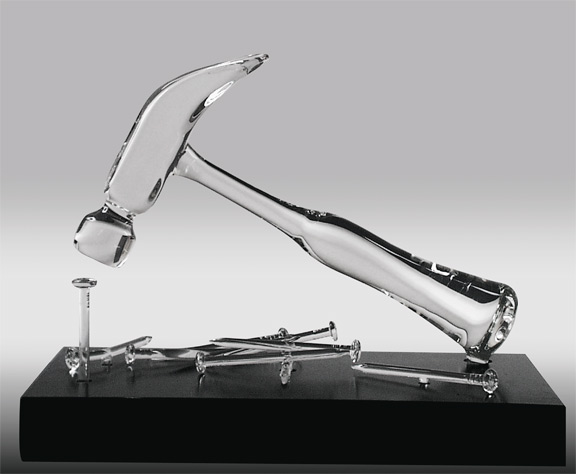
Hammer and Nails sculpture, 1977.

Hans Godo Frabel (born 1941 in Jena, East Germany) is an East German–born lampwork glass blower, now living and working in the US.

== Biography ==
Hans Godo Frabel is one of the first lampwork glass artists in the world. He turned the technique of "working at the lamp" to an art form back in 1968, when he opened the Frabel Studio in Atlanta, Georgia. At that time crystal glass was not considered a serious art medium and few artists were utilizing the beauty and diversity of glass to create unique art pieces.

Frabel was the third child in a family with five children. The tumultuous political climate after World War II necessitated a family migration to West Germany. After living in several different cities, Frabel began to look at glass as a means to a career at the age of 15. He obtained a traineeship as a scientific glassblower at the prestigious Jena Glaswerke in Mainz, West Germany, and earned the degree of journeyman in 1959.

In 1965 he came to the United States and settled in Atlanta. There he obtained a position at the Georgia Institute of Technology in their scientific glass blowing laboratory. During this time he continued his studies of glass as an art form at Emory University and Georgia State.

While working at Georgia Tech, Frabel created crystal glass sculptures as gifts for friends, partners and business associates, inspiring him to become a full-time artist.

Over the next 40 years he followed the European tradition of apprentice and master. As the master artist he passed his skills on to a handpicked group of apprentices and associates, who after many years of training, became master artists in their own right. Among his students was Ginny Ruffner.

"Although Frabel’s art received much attention in the Atlanta area, his international breakthrough as a glass artist was not recognized until 1978 when his pop art sculpture “Hammer and Nails” was utilized as the main (feature) piece of the New Glass Art Exhibition" For the next few years the exhibition toured the world visiting museums in major cities. The Hammer and Nails can now be found in the permanent collection of the National Building Museum in Washington D.C.

Frabel's work embodies a host of mixed expressions, which find their voice in the enormous diversity of his art. His rapid exhaustion of any given subject matter and his sudden interest in a new field have given him the reputation of impetuosity in the field of torch-worked glass art. His unusual precision at the torch, developed through the rigor of the master craftsman system of Germany, has earned him the nickname "Machine Hands."

Over the years Frabel's reputation as a master in glass art has spread worldwide beyond the glass community. "Frabel art pieces can be found in public and private collections in over 80 countries worldwide." Some famous collectors of Frabel glass art include Queen Elizabeth II of the United Kingdom, the Emperor and Empress of Japan, current and former heads of governments such as Jimmy Carter, Ronald Reagan, Margaret Thatcher, Anwar Sadat as well as museums in London, Paris, Tokyo, Dresden, Valencia, Corning, San Francisco, New York and Washington D.C.

"Until the mid nineties the Frabel Studio created art pieces almost exclusively in clear borosilicate – a strong, brilliant crystal that is resistant to scratches and which if broken can usually be restored without a trace of damage." In the early 1990s the Frabel Studio explored the use of color which has been part of its art collection ever since. "Other techniques the Studio employs are sandblasting and painting. Sandblasting gives the sculpture a frosted, highlighted appearance."

== Special exhibitions ==
Atlanta Botanical Gardens

Hans Godo Frabel in front of his Large Cube with Imploding Glass Spheres Atlanta Botanical Garden, 2007.

Amolops cremnobatus (Loa Torrent Frog) 4"x3"x2", Atlanta Botanical Garden, 2007.

Green Branch with 5 Frosted Sprites 19"x9"x13", Atlanta Botanical Garden, 2007.
