= Jon Shirley =

American business magnate and philanthropist (born 1938)

- Born: April 12, 1938 (age 88); San Diego, California
- Occupation: Former President of Microsoft
- Spouses: Mary (m. 1964; died 2013) Kim (m. 2016)

Jon A. Shirley (born April 12, 1938) is an American businessman. He was at one time the president, chief operating officer, and director of the Microsoft Corporation. He is a collector of vintage cars and modern art.

== Early life and education ==
Shirley was born to Joseph and Mercedes Shirley in San Diego, California, where Joseph was stationed in the U.S. Navy. Jon Shirley attended The Hill School in Pottstown, Pennsylvania, and the Massachusetts Institute of Technology in Cambridge, Massachusetts.

== Career ==
Shirley started 25-year tenure at Radio Shack as a store department manager in Boston before the company's acquisition by the Tandy Corporation in 1963. Tandy Corporation founder Charles Tandy sent Shirley to open the first Radio Shack stores in California, then later sent him to Brussels, Belgium, to open the first European stores as merchandising vice president. Shirley was also responsible for Radio Shack's computer division and as vice president of computer merchandising, he was credited with propelling the Tandy Corporation and its 7,000 Radio Shack stores into its position as the world's largest merchandiser of microcomputers.

Radio Shack was a large customer of the Microsoft Corporation and Shirley worked closely with Bill Gates, Microsoft co-founder, to create Radio Shack products utilizing Microsoft software. In 1983, Gates recruited Shirley to join Microsoft as president, chief operating officer, and director. During his tenure, Shirley ran the daily operations of the company and oversaw the construction of the Microsoft campus in Redmond, Washington. He brought to Microsoft managerial maturity and knowledge of the retail sales of computers, and helped guide the company through its initial public offering in 1986.

Shirley was credited as being the architect of Microsoft's financial and managerial infrastructure that allowed the company's financial growth in the 1980s and into the 1990s. He retired as president and chief operating officer of Microsoft in 1990 and from its board of directors in 2008. Shirley was once mentioned in press accounts for refusing to upgrade his second computer to Windows Vista after upgrading his first.

== Car collection ==
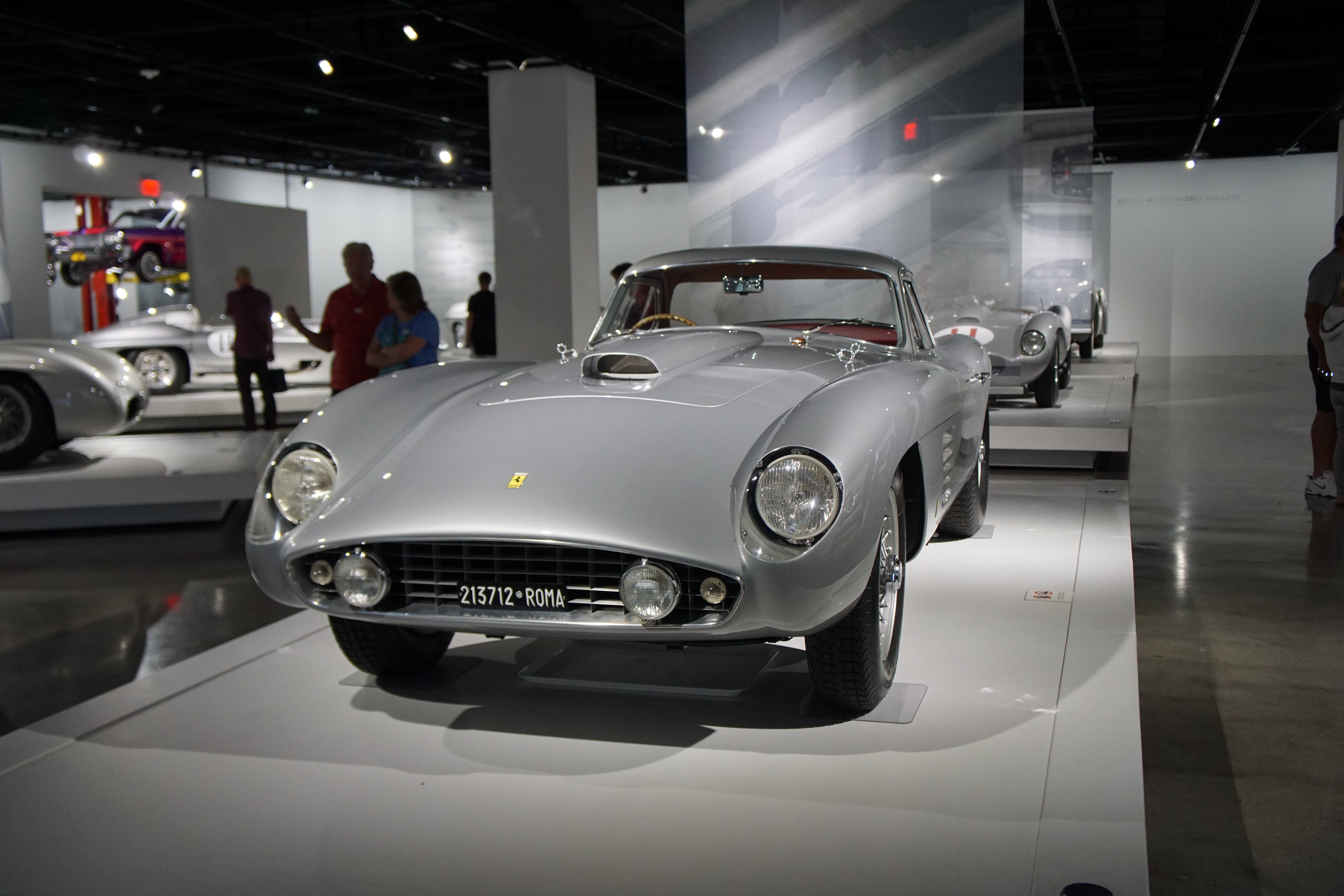
The 1954 375 MM Scaglietti coupe

Shirley is a racer of vintage cars and has a significant car collection that includes vintage Ferraris, Alfa Romeos, and sports racers from the 1950s and 1960s. Highlights of his collection include a 1938 Alfa Romeo 8C 2900B and a 1954 Ferrari 375 MM Scaglietti coupe. The Alfa Romeo 8C 2900B won Best of Show at the 2008 Pebble Beach Concours d'Elegance, Best of Show at the 2016 Chantilly Concours d'Etat, and the 2009/10 Louis Vuitton Classic Concours Award.

The 1954 375 MM Scaglietti coupe, which was commissioned by Italian film director Roberto Rossellini, became the first post-World War II car since 1968 and the first Ferrari to earn Best of Show at the Pebble Beach Concours d'Elegance in 2014. Shirley and Butch Dennison of Dennison International Motorsports spent more than two years rebuilding and restoring the car. Shirley's first sports car purchase was a 1961 4-cylinder Sunbeam Alpine, chosen for the simple reason that he felt it would be fun to drive.

== Philanthropy ==
Through the Jon and Mary Shirley Foundation, Jon and his late wife, Mary, have supported not-for-profit arts, educational, and human service organizations. They spearheaded the creation of the Olympic Sculpture Park in downtown Seattle, providing the lead gift that facilitated the park's construction and funding an endowment to provide for the ongoing operations of the park. Shirley served as chairman of the board of trustees of the Seattle Art Museum and as chair of the Olympic Sculpture Park's building committee.

Collectors of modern and contemporary art, particularly the work of Alexander Calder, Jon and Mary Shirley gave Alexander Calder's Eagle to the Olympic Sculpture Park. In 2023, the Shirleys donated 48 works by Calder, valued at $200 million, to the Seattle Art Museum. Between 2016 and 2026, they contributed $10 million to the restoration of Calder's Mountains and Clouds.
