= @earth =

2011 photo-essay book by Peter Kennard and Tarek Salhany

- Author: Peter Kennard assisted by Tarek Salhany
- Language: Visual, non-verbal
- Subject: Politics, climate change, human rights, economics
- Genre: Art, non-fiction
- Published: 2011 (Tate Publishing Ltd)
- Publication place: United Kingdom
- Media type: Hardback PLC with exposed greyboards B6 pocketbook: 176 x 125mm
- Pages: 192 pages in colour and black and white
- ISBN: 978-1-85437-984-9

@earth is a 2011 book made by the London-born (and based) photomontage artist Peter Kennard with Lebanese artist Tarek Salhany. It is a photo-essay told through photomontage with seven chapters exposing the current state of the Earth, the conditions of life on it and the need to resist injustice. It was released on 1 May 2011 by Tate Publishing.

Apart from the title @earth (which is also in different languages on its back cover) the pocket book contains no words and its story is told in sequences of constructed images.

@earth combines images created digitally over the preceding two years by Kennard with Salhany especially for the project, with Kennard's earlier darkroom based photomontages (spanning over 40 years of work) some of which are part of the Tate Permanent Collection. They have been recontextualised for the book. The authors met when Kennard taught Salhany at the Byam Shaw School of Art in London.

@earth was launched during a 3-day event called shooting@earth at Black Rat Projects in London, together with a display of artworks by War Boutique. The centrepiece was a paintball shooting gallery where visitors could fire at silhouetted figures of city bankers. Starting concurrently, an exhibition of works from the book was held at Raven Row in London. The exhibition included prints of the digital works pasted on the gallery walls by dr.d as well as Kennard's earlier montages
