= Wake (sculpture) =

Sculpture in Seattle, Washington, U.S.

- The sculpture in 2013
- Artist: Richard Serra
- Year: 2004
- Type: Sculpture
- Medium: Weathering steel
- Location: Olympic Sculpture Park (Seattle Art Museum); Seattle, Washington; 47.61716°N 122.3556°W

Wake is a 2004 weathering steel sculpture by Richard Serra, installed at Olympic Sculpture Park in Seattle, Washington. Arts Observer called the installation "a must-see", offering "incredibly diverse perspectives from various angles and vantage points". It was the first piece installed in the park, in July 2006.

== See also ==
- 2004 in art
