= Seattle Cloud Cover =

Glass bridge and sculpture in Seattle, Washington, U.S.

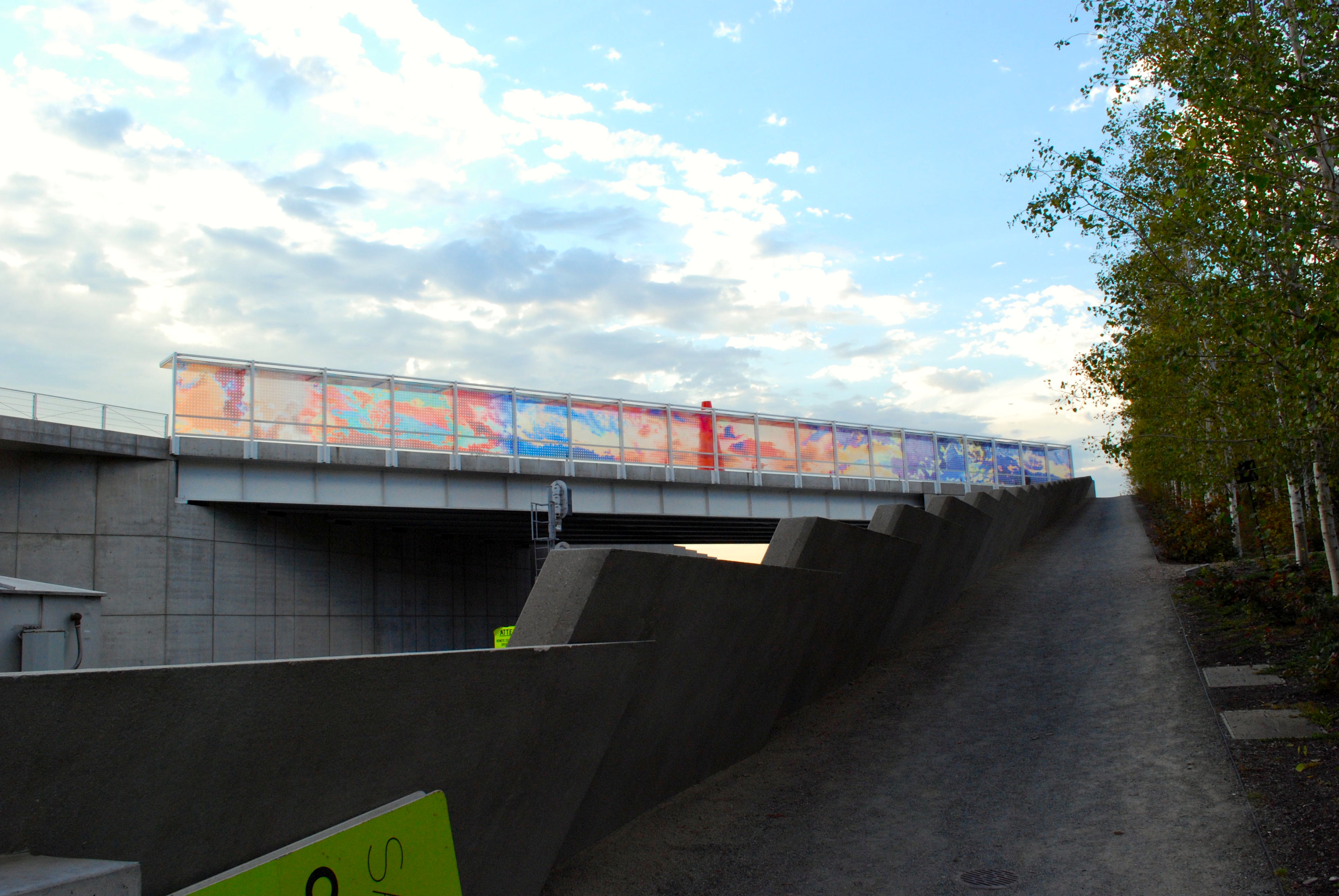
- The bridge in 2008
- Type: Bridge, sculpture
- Medium: Laminated glass
- Location: Seattle, Washington, United States; 47.615631°N 122.355434°W

Seattle Cloud Cover is an outdoor glass bridge and sculpture by American artist Teresita Fernández, installed in Olympic Sculpture Park in Seattle, Washington, in the United States. The bridge, which displays images of the "changing sky discovered in nature and art", was approved in 2004 and completed in 2006. The project marks Fernandez's first permanent publicly sited work. Seattle Cloud Cover is made of laminated glass with a "photographic design interlayer". It measures approximately 9 feet (2.7 m), 6 inches (15 cm) x 200 feet (61 m) x 6 feet (1.8 m), 3 inches (7.6 cm). The work was financed by the Olympic Sculpture Park Art Acquisition Fund in honor of the Seattle Art Museum's 75th anniversary.

== See also ==
- 2006 in art
