= Eye Benches I, II and III =

Sculpture in Seattle, Washington, U.S.

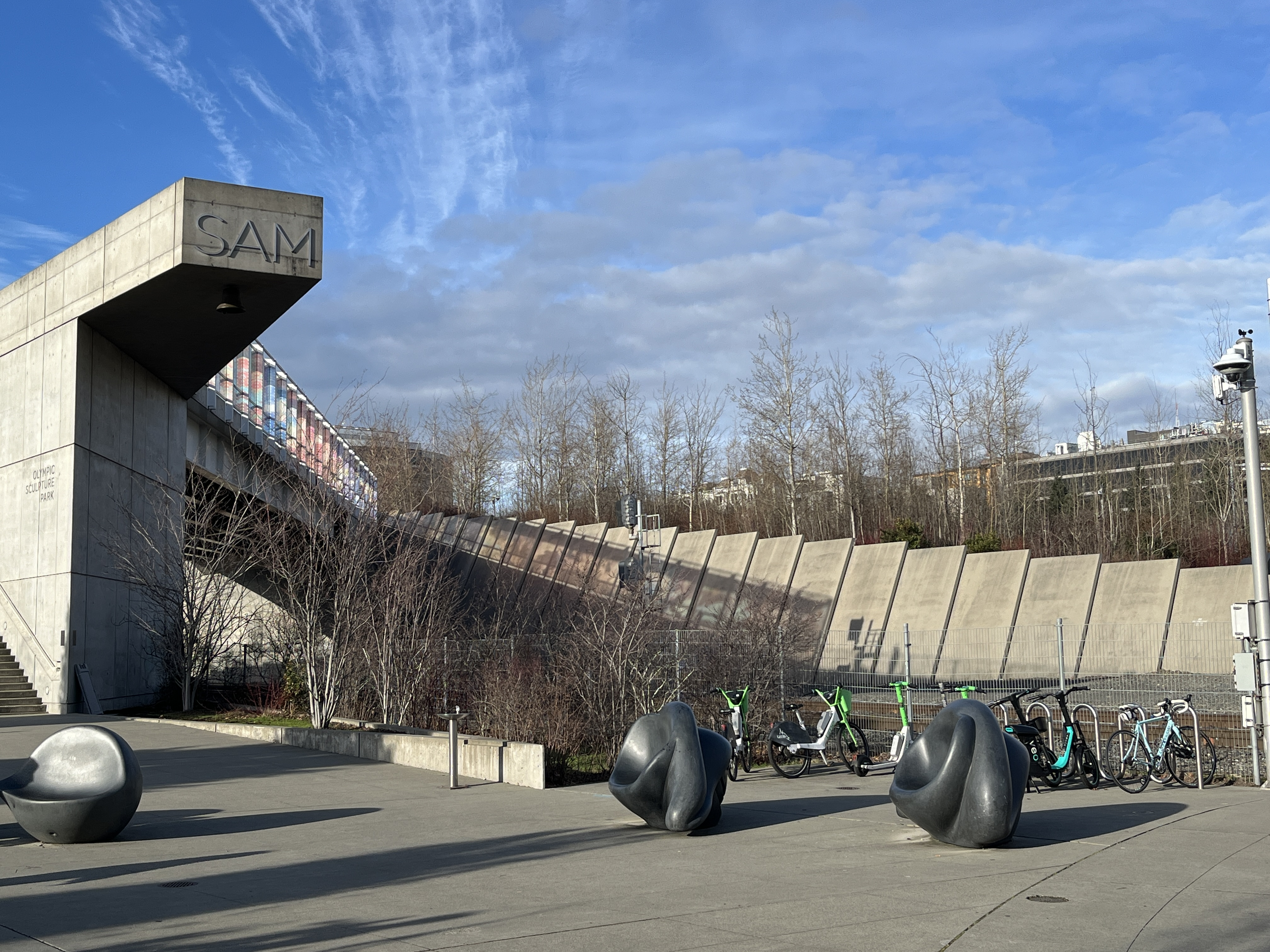
- Some of the installation's pieces, which are functional benches, in 2024
- Artist: Louise Bourgeois
- Year: 1996–1997
- Type: Sculpture
- Location: Olympic Sculpture Park (Seattle Art Museum); Seattle, Washington; 47°36′54.6″N 122°21′18.4″W

Eye Benches I, II and III is a 1996–1997 series of outdoor sculptures by Louise Bourgeois, installed at Olympic Sculpture Park in Seattle, Washington. The installation includes three sets of two functional benches. The sets are individually known as Eye Benches I, Eye Benches II, and Eye Benches III.

== See also ==
- 1997 in art
- List of artworks by Louise Bourgeois
