= Split (sculpture) =

Sculpture in Seattle, Washington, U.S.

- The sculpture in 2022
- Artist: Roxy Paine
- Year: 2003
- Type: Sculpture
- Medium: Stainless steel
- Location: Olympic Sculpture Park (Seattle Art Museum); Seattle, Washington; 47.616085°N 122.354071°W

Split is an outdoor 2003 stainless steel sculpture by Roxy Paine, installed at Olympic Sculpture Park in the neighborhood of Belltown in Seattle, Washington.

The sculpture is a life-sized steel representation of a tree without any leaves. Naturally, birds such as crows can be seen occasionally resting on the branches. It was built in a way that the two main branches diverge in direction, making it look more natural. It is approximately 15.24 m (50 ft) tall.
