= Perre's Ventaglio III =

Sculpture in Seattle, Washington, U.S.

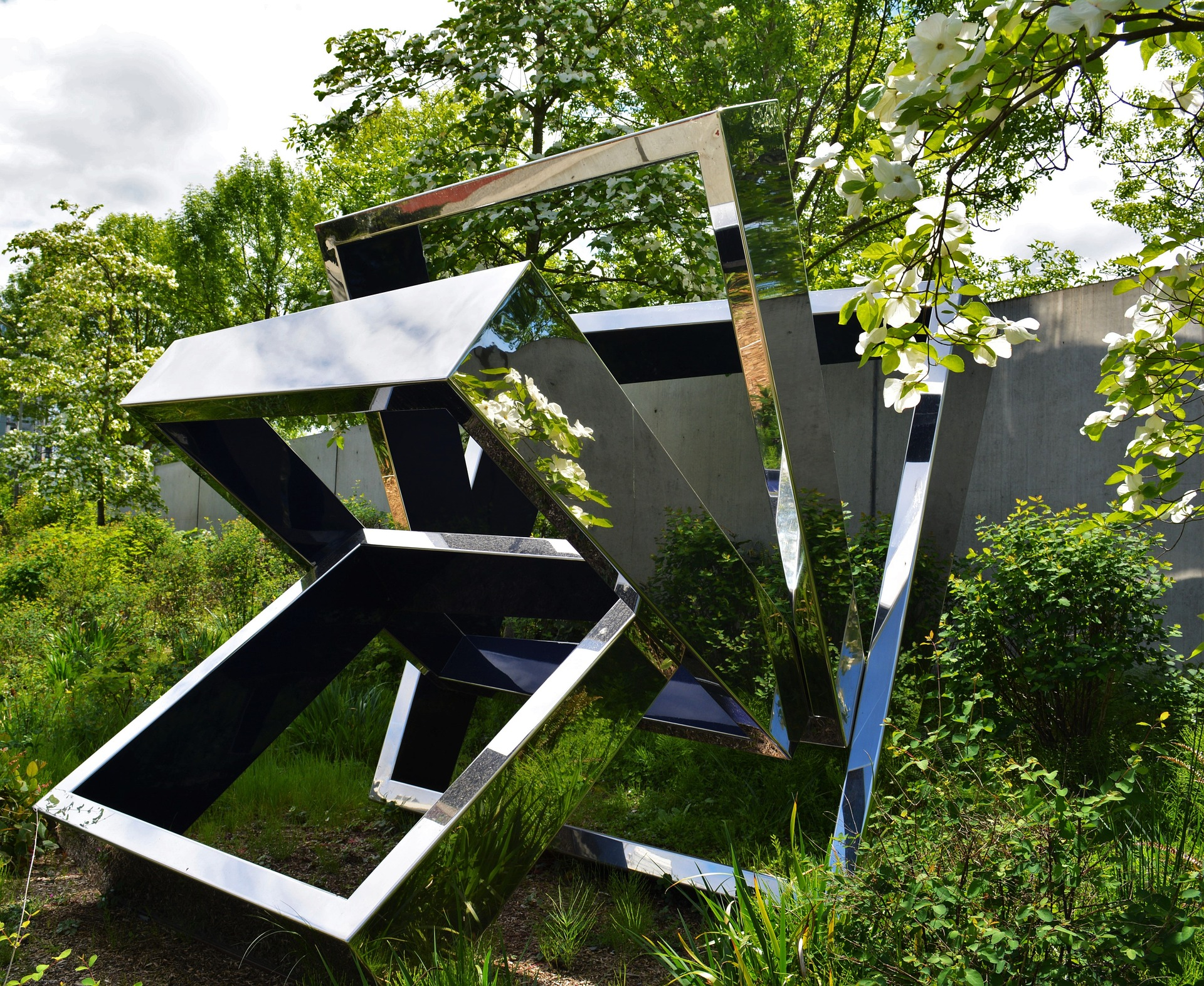
- Perre's Ventaglio III in Olympic Sculpture Park in Seattle, WA
- Artist: Beverly Pepper
- Year: 1967
- Type: Sculpture
- Medium: Stainless steel; enamel
- Location: Olympic Sculpture Park (Seattle Art Museum); Seattle, Washington; 47°36′59.73″N 122°21′34.21″W

Perre's Ventaglio III is an outdoor 1967 stainless steel and enamel sculpture by Beverly Pepper, installed at Olympic Sculpture Park in Seattle, Washington.

== See also ==
- 1967 in art
