= Persephone Unbound =

Sculpture in Seattle, Washington, U.S.

- The sculpture in 2013
- Artist: Beverly Pepper
- Year: 1999
- Type: Sculpture
- Medium: Cast bronze
- Location: Olympic Sculpture Park (Seattle Art Museum); Seattle, Washington; 47°36′59.73″N 122°21′34.21″W

Persephone Unbound is an outdoor 1999 cast bronze sculpture by Beverly Pepper, installed at Olympic Sculpture Park in Seattle, Washington.

== See also ==
- 1999 in art
