= Curve XXIV =

Sculpture in Seattle, Washington, U.S.

- The sculpture in 2024
- Artist: Ellsworth Kelly
- Year: 1981
- Type: Sculpture
- Medium: Weathering steel
- Location: Olympic Sculpture Park (Seattle Art Museum); Seattle, Washington; 47.616261°N 122.353965°W

Curve XXIV is an outdoor weathering steel sculpture by American artist Ellsworth Kelly, installed at Olympic Sculpture Park in Seattle, from 1981. The pieces measures 6 feet, 4 inches by 19 feet by 4 inches. It is one of several fan-shaped sculptures by Kelly.

== See also ==
- 1981 in art
