= Frank Ellis (lecturer) =

British author and former lecturer

Frank Ellis is an author and former lecturer in Russian and Slavonic Studies at the University of Leeds who was suspended for racism.

== Life ==
Before entering academia, Ellis served in the Parachute Regiment and the Special Air Service. Prior to his appointment at Leeds University he taught at the University of Nevada, Las Vegas.

In 2000, Ellis was criticised after making plans to attend a conference hosted by American Renaissance, where he would deliver a speech attacking the findings of the inquiry into the murder of Stephen Lawrence (the "Macpherson Report"), under the title "Racial Hysteria in Britain". Ellis had written for white supremacist magazine American Renaissance before the conference, and continued writing for it after. He subsequently published, in early 2001, his book The Macpherson Report – Anti-Racist Hysteria and the Sovietisation of Britain, with a preface by Antony Flew.

On 24 February 2006, a contributor to the university newspaper Leeds Student, Matt Kennard, interviewed Ellis during which the academic expressed his support for claims in The Bell Curve by Richard Herrnstein and Charles Murray that racial differences in average intelligence have genetic causes. The Leeds Student also published an article by Ellis, "Time to face the truth about Multiculturalism", in which he described the Parekh Report as "a very nasty anti-white tract". Ellis and Kennard were then interviewed together on BBC Radio 4's Today programme. Ellis's comments were widely condemned, particularly in the light of his endorsement of the British National Party. A campaign was launched by Hanif Leylabi, President of the Unite Against Fascism organisation, which called upon the university to sack Ellis. The story received coverage in The Observer, The Daily Telegraph, The Independent, Times Higher Education and various other national newspapers and radio stations as well as national and local television services. A statement was released by Leeds University Union calling for his dismissal. Leeds University condemned Ellis' views as "abhorrent".

Ellis was subsequently suspended by the Vice-Chancellor, Michael Arthur, pending disciplinary proceedings. The university issued a media release stating that it was investigating an alleged breach of its diversity policy. It also said Ellis's views were wholly at odds with the university's values, he had jeopardised the university's obligations under the Race Relations (Amendment) Act 2000, and that he had not apologised for his remarks. Ellis took early retirement in June 2006, pre-empting the outcome of the disciplinary action.

Ellis addressed the Enoch Powell Centenary Dinner of the far-right Traditional Britain Group in 2012 on the subject of "Liberal Totalitarianism".

== Selected publications ==
- Race, Marxism and the "Deconstruction" of the United Kingdom. Journal of Social, Political and Economic Studies, Vol 26, No 4, pp. 691–718 (Winter 2001).
- Political Correctness and the Theoretical Struggle: From Lenin and Mao to Marcus and Foucault. Maxim Institute, Auckland, 2004.
- Time to face the truth about Multiculturalism. Leeds Student, 2006. Time to face the truth about Multiculturalism

=== On Russia ===
- Vasily Grossman: The Genesis and Evolution of a Russian Heretic (1994)
- From Glasnost to the Internet: Russia's New Infosphere (Palgrave MacMillan, 1998).
- The Stalingrad Cauldron: Inside the Encirclement and Destruction of the 6th Army (University Press of Kansas, 2013)

== See also ==
- Race and intelligence
