= Bunyon's Chess =

Sculpture in Seattle, Washington, U.S.

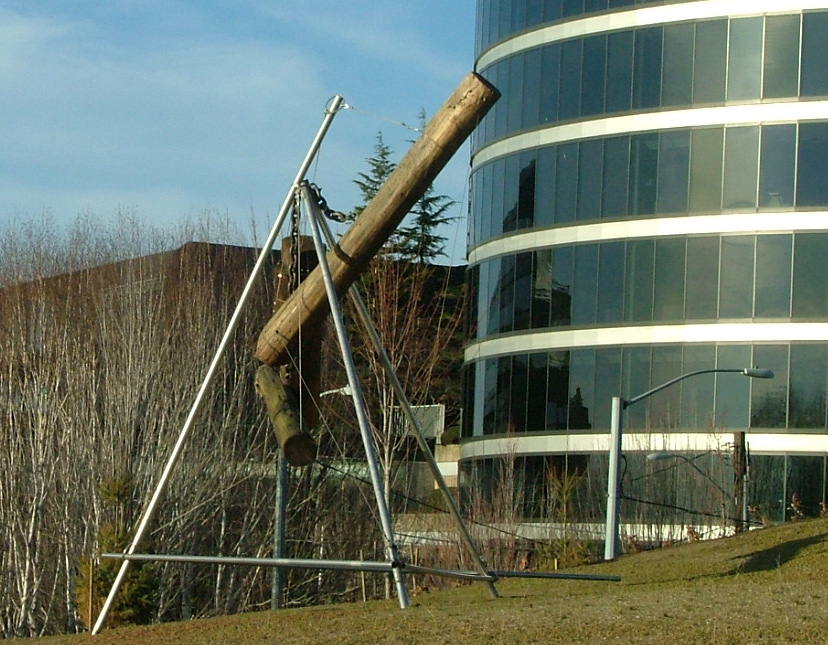
- The sculpture in 2007
- Artist: Mark di Suvero
- Year: 1965
- Type: Sculpture
- Medium: Stainless steel; wood
- Dimensions: 6.7 m (22 ft)
- Location: Olympic Sculpture Park (Seattle Art Museum); Seattle, Washington; 47.616871°N 122.356576°W

Bunyon's Chess is an outdoor 1965 sculpture by Mark di Suvero, installed at Olympic Sculpture Park in Seattle, Washington. The stainless steel and wood piece is 22 feet (6.7 m) tall.

Conservation work on Bunyon's Chess was completed by the Seattle Art Museum in 2018.

== See also ==
- 1965 in art
