= Matt Kennard (journalist) =

British writer (born 1983)

- Born: Matthew Kennard; 1983 (age 42–43); London, England, UK
- Education: Leeds University
- Occupations: Journalist, author
- Years active: 2006–present
- Notable work: Irregular Army; The Racket; Silent Coup
- Relatives: Peter Kennard (father)

Matthew Kennard (born 1983 in London, England) is an English author and journalist. From 2019 to 2024, he was the head of investigations at the investigative journalism website Declassified UK, which he co-founded with author and historian Mark Curtis.

Kennard has previously written for the New Statesman, The Guardian, the Financial Times, openDemocracy and The Intercept. He has also appeared on Novara Media. He was a Bertha Fellow and then Director at the Centre for Investigative Journalism in London.

Kennard is the author of three books: Irregular Army: How the US Military Recruited Neo-Nazis, Gang Members, and Criminals to Fight the War on Terror (2012; updated edition 2026), The Racket: A Rogue Reporter vs. the Masters of the Universe (2015) and Silent Coup: How Corporations Overthrew Democracy (2023).

== Student journalism ==
In 2005, Kennard wrote an article in the UCLA student paper, the Daily Bruin, on attempts by Harvard professor Alan Dershowitz to suppress the publication of Norman Finkelstein's Beyond Chutzpah by the University of California Press.

As a Leeds University student, Kennard wrote for Leeds Student. In 2006, while a student journalist, he interviewed then Leeds University lecturer Frank Ellis, who expressed racism. Kennard and Ellis were interviewed on the Today programme on BBC Radio 4.

== Declassified UK ==
In 2019, Kennard and Curtis founded Declassified UK, a news website that concentrates on military and foreign policy. Until September 2021, the website was hosted as a sub-site by the South Africa-based online newspaper Daily Maverick.

In June 2020, Kennard published an investigation into a GCHQ schools programme run by the UK National Cyber Security Centre. The investigation was critical of the programme and GCHQ stopped responding to his enquiries. Kennard lodged a request for information under the UK Data Protection Act to see if GCHQ had decided to stop dealing with him because of his report on the schools programme. Press Gazette said that the emails Kennard obtained appeared to "show he was blacklisted" by the GCHQ press office for writing a "negative long-read". Kennard commented: "I find it outrageous that the country's largest intelligence agency—funded by the British public to the tune of over a billion pounds annually—just stops engaging with a journalist because it believes my stories paint GCHQ's operations in a 'negative' light … It's doubly worrying in this case because the programme I wanted some basic information on involves thousands of children. In a system that calls itself a democracy, we have a right to know what these types of programmes involve".

In August 2020, Declassified UK contacted the UK Ministry of Defence (MoD) for a comment about a British soldier who had protested against the war in Yemen. The MoD provided no information and a press officer for the MoD eventually commented that "We no longer deal with your publication". Declassified UK's lawyers wrote to the MoD to advise it that the MoD's attitude could be a breach of Article 10 of the European Convention on Human Rights and against the Civil Service Code. National Union of Journalists Assistant General Secretary Seamus Dooley supported Declassified UK and said "The NUJ would be extremely concerned at any unilateral ban by a government department on questions from selected news organisations or publications". A Council of Europe media freedom alert was filed over the issue. The MoD apologised and pledged to treat all media outlets, including Declassified UK, "with fairness and impartiality".

Kennard announced on 28 October 2024 that he had left Declassified UK.

== Personal life ==
Kennard's father is artist Peter Kennard. In 2023, to coincide with Matt Kennard's book with Claire Provost Silent Coup, the art and activist organisation a/political collaborated with Peter Kennard on an installation.
