= Father and Son (sculpture) =

Fountain and sculpture in Seattle, Washington, U.S.

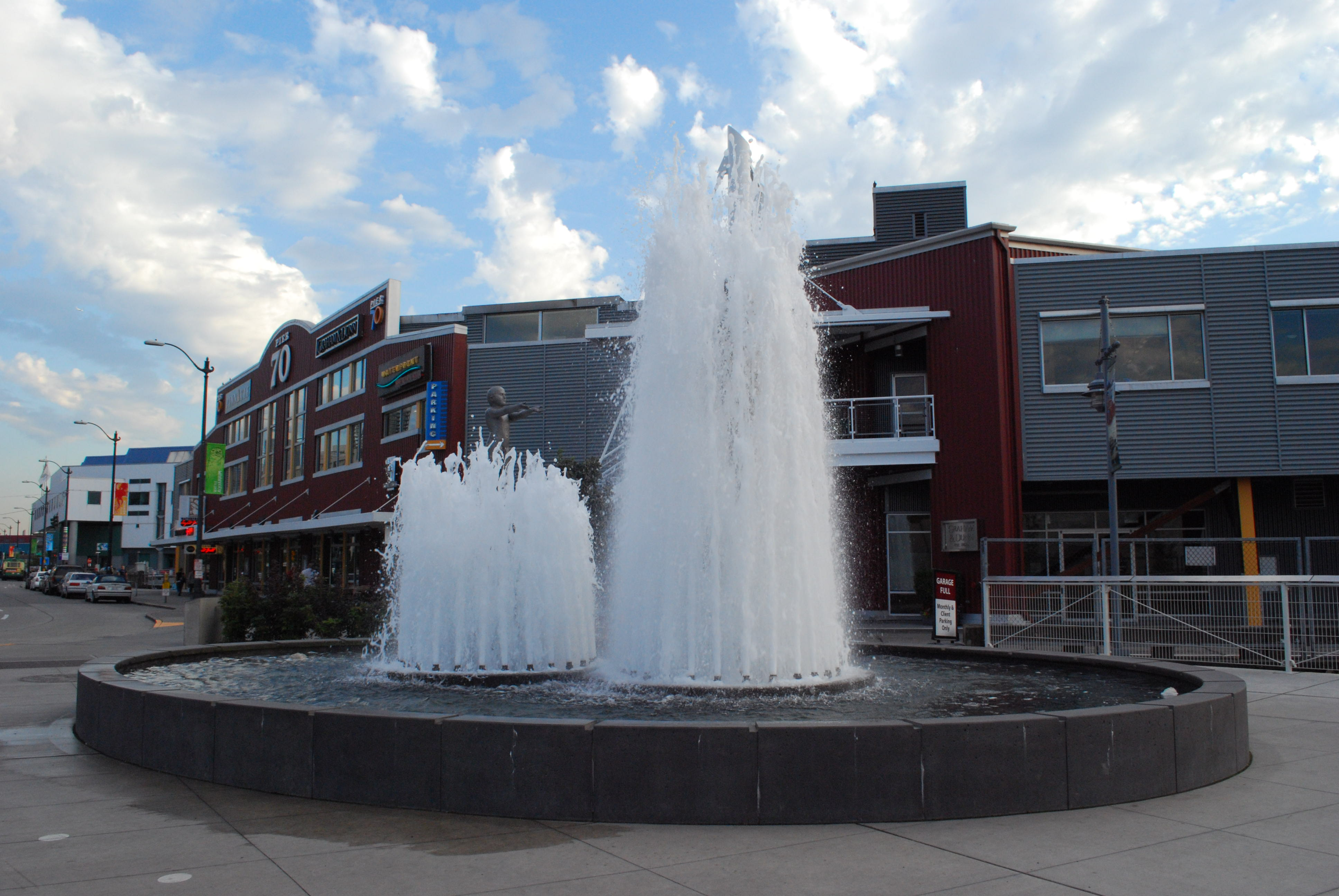
- The fountain and sculpture in 2008
- Artist: Louise Bourgeois
- Year: 2005
- Type: Fountain; sculpture
- Medium: Stainless steel; aluminum; water; bronze
- Location: Seattle, Washington, United States; 47.61504°N 122.355173°W

Father and Son is an outdoor 2005 fountain and sculpture by Louise Bourgeois, installed at Olympic Sculpture Park in Seattle, Washington. It is made of stainless steel, aluminum and features a bronze bell.

== Background ==
Louse Bourgeois created Father and Son in 2005 after being commissioned by the Seattle Art Museum on behalf of Stu Smailes, a local art philanthropist who died in 2002. Smailes donated $1 million to the city after his death, and requested that it be used to create a sculpture in the city featuring a nude male. Bourgeois collaborated on the design and installation of this piece with ORA, a local architecture studio.

== Description ==
The 15-foot fountain and sculpture depict a naked man and a naked boy reaching out to each other. At timed intervals, two separate sides of the fountain will either rise or fall to reveal or obscure one figure or the other.

== Controversy ==
Father and Son is the first public sculpture in Seattle featuring nude figures. While the SAM’s statement on the artwork focuses on the emotional distance and vulnerability of the two figures, others in the local community saw the sculptures as overtly sexual and pedophilic.

== See also ==
- 2005 in art
- List of artworks by Louise Bourgeois
