= Two Plane Vertical Horizontal Variation III =

Sculpture by George Rickey

- The sculpture in 2024
- Artist: George Rickey
- Location: Seattle, Washington, U.S.
- 47°37′0.2″N 122°21′18.3″W

Two Plane Vertical Horizontal Variation III is a 1973 sculpture by George Rickey, installed at Seattle's Olympic Sculpture Park, in the U.S. state of Washington.
