= Riviera (sculpture) =

Sculpture by Anthony Caro in Seattle, Washington, U.S.

- Artist: Anthony Caro
- Year: 1971–1974
- Type: Sculpture
- Medium: Steel

Riviera is a 1971–1974 rusted and varnished steel sculpture by Anthony Caro, formerly installed at Olympic Sculpture Park in Seattle, Washington.
