= Monolith and Shadow =

2005 sculpture by John Aiken

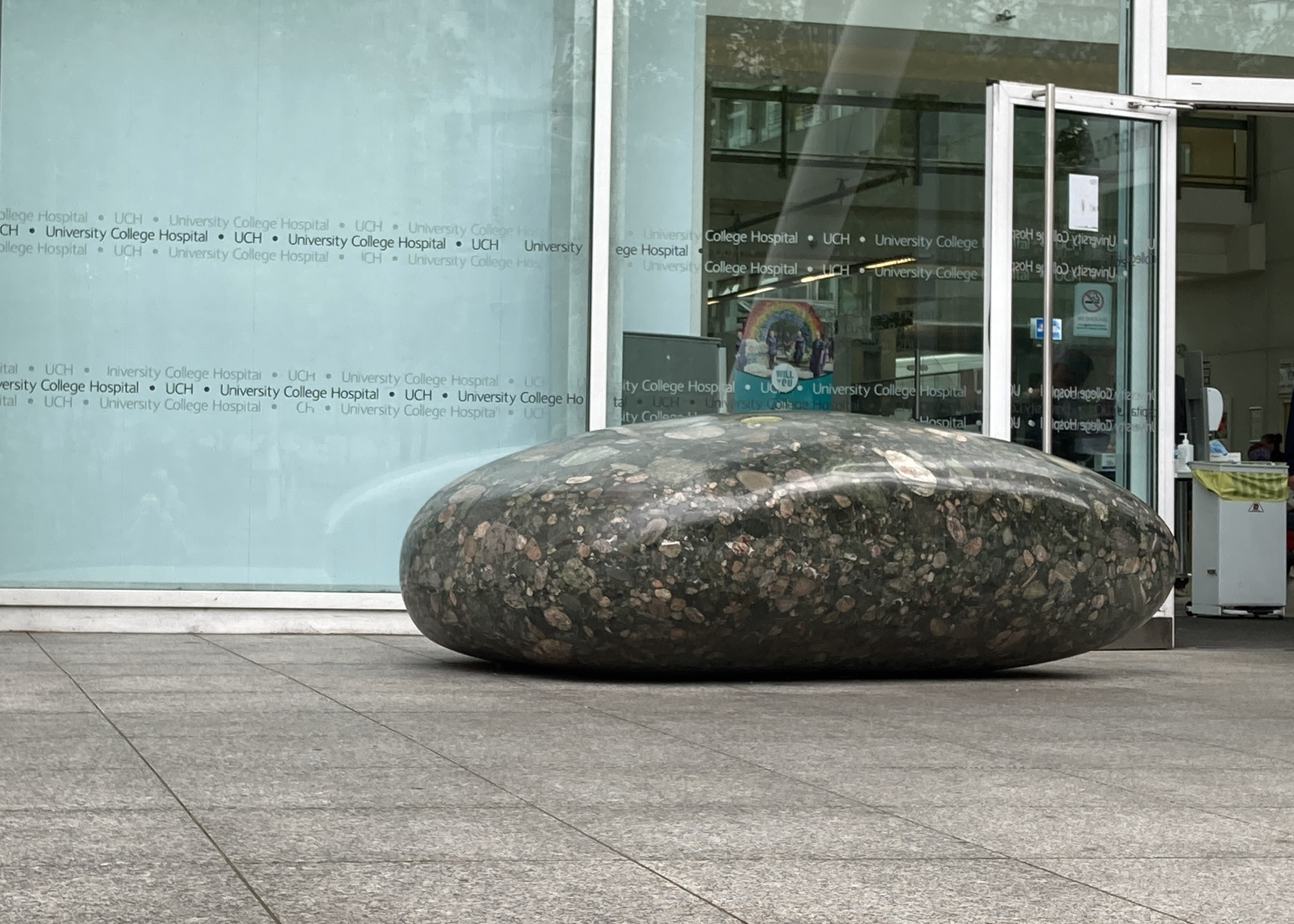
- The sculpture in September 2022

Monolith and Shadow is a 2005 sculpture by John Aiken. It is outside the entrance to University College Hospital (UCH) in central London. The sculpture is formed from a single piece of highly polished Brazilian granite.

== Description ==
Monolith and Shadow is located outside the main entrance to University College Hospital (UCH) on Euston Road in Fitzrovia in central London. It is formed from a single piece of highly polished Brazilian conglomerate. It consists of "large, rounded cobbles of quartzite, granitoids, gneiss, basic igneous rocks and ironstones in a green, epidote-and chlorite-rich matrix". It was quarried in Oliveira dos Brejinhos in the state of Bahia in north eastern Brazil. The stone comes from the Riacho Fundo Formation (Pajeu Synthem) and was part of the Serra do Espinhaco, an Early to Mid-Proterozoic mountain range. It was deposited 1.6 billion years ago.

It was supplied by the stone contractors Granitos Maceiras and marketed as 'Verde Tropicalía'. The stone was polished and sculpted into its present form by John Aiken, the head of sculpture at the Slade School of Fine Art. The sculpture was designed to be used as seating.

The piece was intended to improve the built environment of the newly built University College Hospital which had opened in June 2005. The chief nurse of UCH, Louise Boden, said that there was " ... increasing evidence that a welcoming and interesting atmosphere improves both patient well-being" and that a "healing environment is crucial to a positive patient experience". The work was part of the Art in the Hospital project which cost £250,000. The many different stones that form the sculpture are intended to represent the many different institutions that combined to create University College Hospital and the history of the King's Fund medical charity.

The sculpture cost £70,000, half funded by donations from staff and the public, with their donations matched by the medical charity, the King's Fund as part of their Enhancing the Healing Environment programme. No funds intended for patient care were spent on the sculpture.

== Reception ==
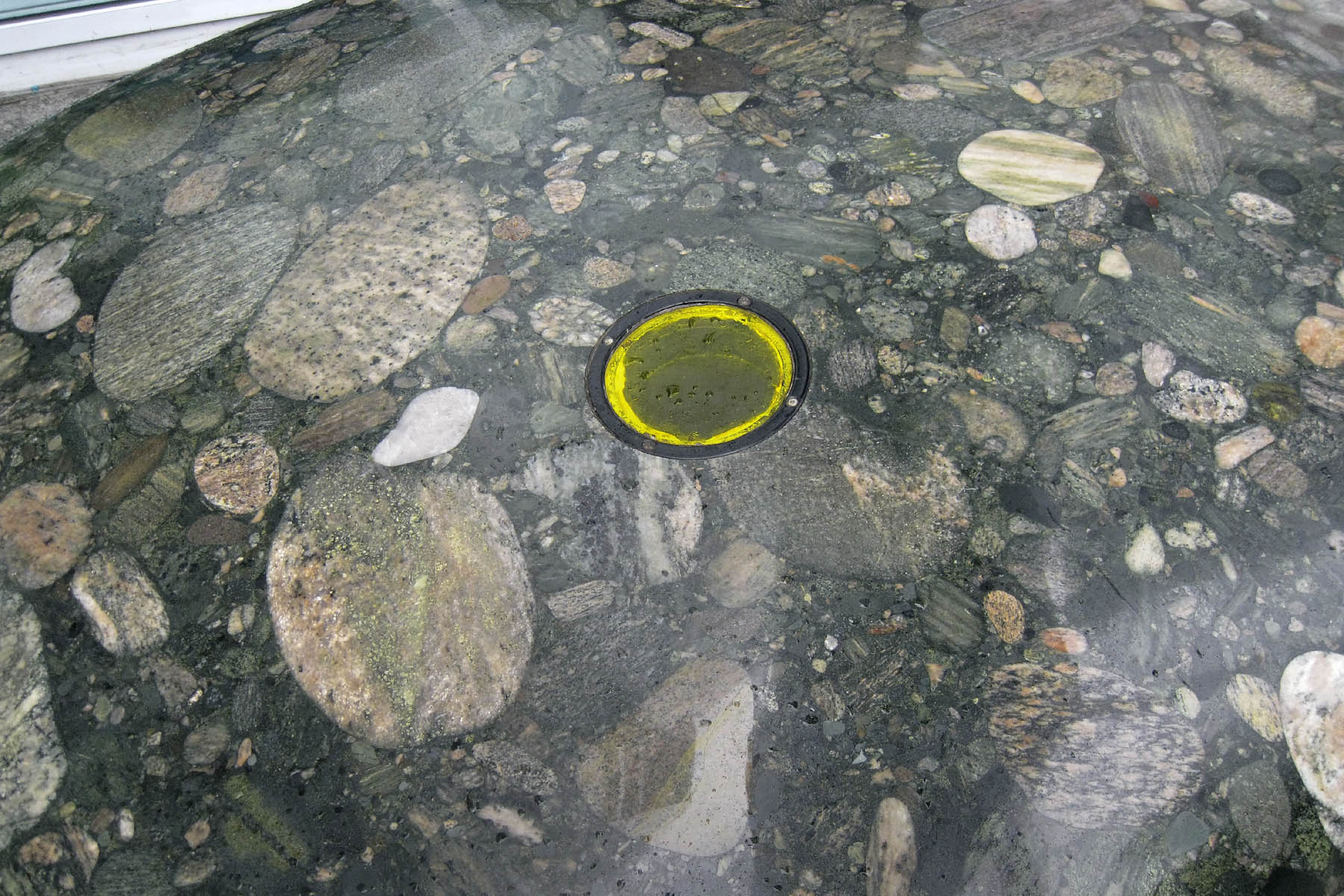
Detail of Monolith and Shadow

The unveiling of Monolith and Shadow in August 2005 attracted strong criticism in the tabloid press in Britain. The purchase of the piece was criticised by The Daily Mail and The Sun newspapers. The Daily Mail likened the piece to a gallstone and questioned its role in improving care for hospital patients. The sculpture was the subject of a front-page story in The Sun headlined "Off Their Rockers: Hospital spends £70,000 on giant pebble". Opprobrium was aimed at the cost of the sculpture as it was incorrectly believed by critics that the money spent on the piece could have been spent on patient care. The sculpture was also said to be insulting to the victims of the July 2005 London bombing who were being treated at the hospital and the abstract form of the piece was also criticised.

In her column for The Guardian, Lucy Mangan criticised the purchase of Monolith and Shadow in the wake of her suffering at a hospital for six hours with trapped wind. Mangan wrote that she wished to know if " ... nobody at all in the long chain of decision-makers that must surely stretch out behind the existence of this cripplingly expensive rock ever think to stop and ask whether there was not some way that this cash, or the energies - the well-intentioned though hopelessly misguided energies - that went into raising it could have been diverted into researching the causes of leukaemia, say, or into raising awareness of the fact that the NHS is about to break under the strain of imbecilities like this?".
