= The Racket (book) =

2015 book by Matthew Kennard

The Racket: A Rogue Reporter vs. the Masters of the Universe
- Cover of the first edition
- Author: Matt Kennard
- Language: English
- Published: London
- Publisher: Zed Books
- Publication date: 9 April 2015
- Publication place: United Kingdom
- Media type: Print
- Pages: 400
- ISBN: 9781780329888

The Racket: A Rogue Reporter vs. the Masters of the Universe is a 2015 book by British investigative journalist Matt Kennard.

== Synopsis ==
The Racket is an investigative account of the business and political elite who run the world. The book features interviews with many high-profile figures such as Henry Kissinger from Kennard's unbridled access over four years to the global elite. Kennard writes that "The world as we know it is run by a squad of cigar-smoking men with big guns, big cash and a reach much too close to home" The book also investigates American imperialism and the mission to exploit the resources of the developing world.

== Reception ==
Writer, political activist and newspaper columnist Owen Jones described the book as a "A crucial exposé of the powerful, of injustice, and of the war against the poor. It should inspire all of us to fight back" while author, political activist and filmmaker Naomi Klein said "In this important book, Kennard explores the direct impacts of militarised, globalised American capitalism on some of the most battered parts of our world. With devastating precision and a formidable sense of urgency, he reports on corporate shock doctors in Haiti, imperialist drug warriors in Honduras, pillaging coal and mining giants in southern Africa and Appalachia—and so much more. Most importantly, he never loses sight of the growing numbers of resistors holding on to their creativity and self-determination in the face of these forces." The book was also praised by Noam Chomsky, Antony Loewenstein, Walden Bello, amongst others.

In The Guardian, Steven Poole argued that "it gets quite difficult to keep all the facts consistent with a single conspiriological explanation for everything" and is critical of alleged Anti-Americanism in the book, but praises other elements such as exposure of capitalist hypocrisy and exploitation in the developing world. Publishers Weekly described the book as "ambitious but only intermittently successful".
