= Photo Op (photomontage) =

2005 photomontage of Tony Blair taking a selfie against a backdrop of burning oil

Photo Op (2005)

Photo Op is a 2005 photomontage of the British prime minister Tony Blair taking a selfie against a backdrop of burning oil. It was created by the collaborative kennardphillipps, consisting of the artists Peter Kennard and Cat Phillipps.

== Background ==
kennardphillipps are an art collaborative who make works of art inspired by the 2003 invasion of Iraq. kennardphillipps consists of the artists Peter Kennard and Cat Phillipps, the pair use digital collage to campaign against war and capitalism. Photo Op was projected onto the Central Hall in Westminster during the Iraq Inquiry which was being held at the neighbouring Queen Elizabeth II Centre.

The work was created with Photoshop using an image of Blair taking a selfie with Royal Navy cadets during the 2005 General Election campaign. The image of the cadets was replaced with a photograph of burning oil. kennardphillipps said of the work that it was " … born out of two years of hard work to pull down the propaganda machine" and that they were trying to "portray Iraq as it happened and not wait until afterwards and make a history painting". The work was created with the intention that it be used by groups protesting the 31st G8 summit in July 2005 at Gleneagles Hotel in Scotland. Photo Op was subsequently displayed on placards carried by the Clandestine Insurgent Rebel Clown Army Group and was also on leaflets distributed at the DSEI in September 2005.

The work is available to download from the artist's website free of charge and users are encouraged to create their own version of the piece.

== Reception ==
The art critic Jonathan Jones, writing in The Guardian in 2013, described Photo Op as "the definitive work of art about the war". Jones felt that "Ten years on from that war's beginning, this manic digital collage states succinctly what a large number people feel and believe about Blair's responsibility for the chaos that ensued. It says in a nutshell what protesters claimed at the time and what has become a generally accepted version of history – that Tony Blair was a monster charging into Iraq without scruples. Look, there he is, taking a selfie in front of his handiwork". Jones concluded that "Art could not stop the war in Iraq. It can influence how that war is remembered. … The image that stands as popular history is the one of Blair taking his "maniacal selfie" in front of the flames of devastation".

The advertising company CBS Outdoor and JCDecaux refused to display the image on billboards that they owned to advertise the Imperial War Museum exhibition. CBS Outdoor said a poster featuring Photo Op was refused after consultation with the Committee of Advertising Practice. The committee advises companies on whether adverts may breach its code of conduct, with its code forbidding adverts that are likely to cause "serious or widespread offence" or misleading. kennardphillipps accused CBS Outdoor and JCDecaux of "political censorship" in refusing to carry the advert.

Photo Op was extensively analysed by Alan Ingram in his 2019 book Geopolitics and the Event: Rethinking Britain's Iraq War Through Art.

=== Other displays ===
Photo Op was included in Banksy's Christmas Grotto installation on Oxford Street in London by the artist Banksy in November 2006, where it was prominently displayed facing the street. It was displayed at the Imperial War Museum North in the 2013 exhibition Catalyst: Contemporary Art and War. Photo Op was shown on the glass frontage of the Herbert Art Gallery and Museum during their 2013 exhibition of war art Caught in the Crossfire. The National Theatre adapted the image to advertise a performance of Bertolt Brecht's play Mother Courage and Her Children. The work is part of the collection of the National Portrait Gallery, London, the Scottish National Portrait Gallery and the Imperial War Museum. The National Portrait Gallery in London describe Photo Op as "A powerful statement of dissent, [that] has become a defining image of Britain's involvement" in the Iraq War.
