= Peter Kennard =

English photomontage artist

- Born: 17 February 1949 (age 77); Maida Vale, London, England
- Education: Byam Shaw School of Art; Slade School of Fine Art
- Style: Photomontage
- Website: www.peterkennard.com

Peter Kennard (born 17 February 1949) is a London-born and based photomontage artist and Professor of Political Art at the Royal College of Art. Seeking to reflect his involvement in the anti-Vietnam War movement, he turned from painting to photomontage to better address his political views. He is best known for the images he created for the Campaign for Nuclear Disarmament (CND) in the 1970s–80s including a détournement of John Constable's The Hay Wain called "Haywain with Cruise Missiles".

Because many of the left-wing organisations and publications he used to work with have disappeared, Kennard has turned to using exhibitions, books and the internet for his work.

Kennard has work in the public collections of several major London museums and the Arts Council of England. He has his work displayed as part of Tate Britain's permanent collection and is on public view as part of 2013's rehang A Walk Through British Art.

== Education ==
A lifelong Londoner, Kennard was born on Elgin Avenue in Maida Vale. He originally trained as a painter at the Byam Shaw School of Art and the Slade School of Fine Art, University College London and later at the Royal College of Art, where he is now Professor of Political Art.

== Career ==
Kennard has previously been Senior Tutor in the Department of Photography and later Professor of Political Art at the Royal College of Art.

== Exhibitions and projects ==
Kennard abandoned painting in the 1970s in search of new forms of expression that could bring art and politics together for a wider audience. This search has resulted in making photomontage and installation work over many years covering major political events. The visual language he has developed to the present day uses common news imagery, photojournalism and the face. He has often worked in collaboration with writers, photographers, filmmakers and artists such as Peter Reading, John Pilger and Jenny Matthews.

Dispatches from An Unofficial War Artist is his autobiography and was published in 2000. In it, Kennard writes about the possibilities of undertaking an aesthetic practice in relation to social change, and considers how his art has interacted with the politics of actual events. The narrative is thematic rather than chronological, showing how a visual motif can be re-used in different contexts. Kennard's original artwork is often reproduced alongside the newspaper or poster in which it appeared.

Kennard produced a body of work addressing the second Iraq War in 2002. John Berger said of this work:

In these memorable images, in these images that refuse to be forgotten, go very close to the griefs being inflicted – they are still-lifes of grief, and, at the same time includes the time-scale of the mountain. They are the opposite of news flashes. They are full of history's irony, fury and anger at the mistakes made in its name. They reveal the tawdriness of the Gang's half-truths. They acknowledge the pain of what is happening. They might be quoting Simone Weil who wrote: "There is a natural alliance between truth and affliction, because both of them are mute supplicants, eternally condemned to stand speechless in our presence." And they are exemplary because, in face of such inevitable speechlessness, they remind us of the need to speak out in protest, the protests of the dead and the living.

Kennard's "Photo Op" work seen in Santa's Grotto exhibition, London (2011).

Kennard's 2003 photomontage Photo Op (in collaboration with Cat Phillips) of Tony Blair taking a selfie against a backdrop of burning oil, was described by The Guardian as "the definitive work of art about the war". It was created in Photoshop using an image of Blair taking a selfie during the 2005 General Election campaign. Kennard says he was trying to change the world and "portray Iraq as it happened and not wait until afterwards and make a history painting".

Kennard's 2011 project was @earth, a story without words told in the language of photomontage. It takes the form of a small book priced at £9.99, published by the Tate Gallery, which Kennard believed was a reasonably cheap and accessible way of getting his message to young people outside the artworld. The book contains a variety of images from Kennard's 40-year career and, as a result, attracts the criticism that its targets are too general. Kennard's reply was that he wanted "to encourage people to think about their own situation and activate, but I'm not trying to tell them to do this or that. I'm just trying to show how I see the world at the moment."

The idea has expanded to a re-appropriation and re-distribution of his images through online platforms such as Tumblr, Facebook and Twitter. G8 Protest Posters is the latest of these projects that shares images "designed for protest". Created in 2013 in reaction to the 39th G8 summit in Enniskillen, Kennard has encouraged the public to "print, Tweet, Facebook, email and share these images as a sign of protest". He sees online distribution sites as "a valuable addition to the dissident artists toolbox. G8 is a charade masquerading as a serious conference, my posters attempt to rip through the lies and point to the world as in fact it is."

Kennard has also executed a number of guerrilla street installations and has said "if world leaders insist on assaulting our lives and livelihoods, let's hit back by assaulting their eyes."

The first major retrospective of Kennard's work was held at the Imperial War Museum for a year from May 2015. The show then moved to mac birmingham in 2016.

In January 2021, it was announced that Kennard's art would be part of an exhibition at Richard Saltoun Gallery in London, opening the following month.

== Personal life ==
Kennard lives in Hackney, London, after moving from the Paddington area. His son is the investigative journalist Matt Kennard.

== Political views ==
In December 2019, along with 42 other leading cultural figures, Kennard signed a letter endorsing the Labour Party under Jeremy Corbyn's leadership in the 2019 general election. The letter stated that "Labour's election manifesto under Jeremy Corbyn's leadership offers a transformative plan that prioritises the needs of people and the planet over private profit and the vested interests of a few."
