= Cannibals (painting) =

2005 painting by Odd Nerdrum

- Artist: Odd Nerdrum
- Year: 2005
- Medium: Oil on canvas
- Dimensions: 200 cm × 250 cm (79 in × 98 in)
- Location: Private collection

Cannibals is a 2005 painting by the Norwegian kitsch painter Odd Nerdrum. It depicts three men in a barren landscape, devouring the remains of a fourth man whose spine, rib cage and head lie on the ground before them.

The painting was on view at the Paul Booth Gallery in New York City from 20 April to 30 July 2016, as part of the Nerdrum exhibition Crime and Refuge.

== Reception ==
Daniel Maidman wrote in 2016 for Whitehot Magazine that "a very un-PC classical iconography of good and evil is deployed here", as the three cannibals are, "to use the appropriate nomenclature", "a cripple, a madman, and a mongoloid". At the same time, the victim's face is depicted with "the serene beauty of a fallen Siegfried, unimpressed by his humiliation, retaining a steadfast, and perhaps ultimately foolish, faith in cosmic justice". Maidman wrote: "It is a scene of squalid and pervasive evil. It is an evil in collusion with a wicked metaphysics, and therefore an evil from which there is no exit save death."
