= Racket, West Virginia =

- Unincorporated community
- Location within the state of West Virginia Racket (the United States)
- Coordinates: 39°2′39″N 80°56′13″W
- Country: United States
- State: West Virginia
- Counties: Gilmer, Ritchie
- Elevation: 1,168 ft (356 m)
- Time zone: UTC-5 (Eastern (EST))
  - Summer (DST): UTC-4 (EDT)
- GNIS ID: 1549889

Racket is an unincorporated community in Gilmer and Ritchie counties, West Virginia, United States. Their post office has been closed.
