= Ginny Ruffner =

American glass artist (1952–2025)

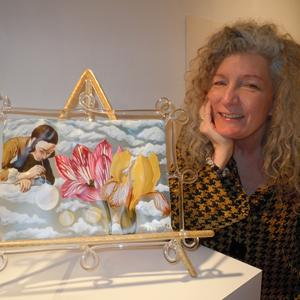
- Born: June 21, 1952; Atlanta, Georgia, U.S.
- Died: January 20, 2025 (aged 72); Ballard, Seattle, U.S.
- Education: University of Georgia
- Known for: Glass artist
- Website: ginnyruffner.com

External videos
- “Curator Tina Oldknow describes Shirts, Cherries, and Snowflakes, of Course by American artist Ginny Ruffner”, Corning Museum of Glass, September 7, 2011.
- "Reforestation of the Imagination: Ginny Ruffner", 2018.

Ginny Carol Ruffner (née Martin; June 21, 1952 – January 20, 2025) was an American glass artist based in Seattle, Washington. She is known for her use of the lampworking (or flameworking) technique and for her use of borosilicate glass in her painted glass sculptures.

Many of her ideas begin with drawings. Her works also include pop-up books, large-scale public art, and augmented reality.

Ruffner was named a Master of the Medium by the James Renwick Alliance in 2007. Ruffner was elected as a Fellow of the American Craft Council in 2010. She received The Glass Art Society's Lifetime Award in 2019.

== Early life ==
Ruffner was born on June 21, 1952, in Atlanta, Georgia. Her father was an FBI agent, and her mother was a typing teacher.

== Career ==
Ruffner studied at Furman University in Greenville, South Carolina, and Winthrop College in Rock Hill, South Carolina, before transferring to the University of Georgia. There she received a BFA in Drawing and Painting in 1974 and an MFA in Drawing and Painting in 1975. In a twentieth century art history course, Ruffner saw The Bride Stripped Bare by Her Bachelors, Even (The Large Glass), a glass painting by Marcel Duchamp. It inspired her to begin painting on glass.

Following graduation, one of Ruffner's first jobs was working for Hans Godo Frabel as an apprentice lamp worker, creating glass animals. In 1984, Ruffner relocated to Seattle, Washington, where she taught the first flameworking class at Pilchuck Glass School. There she introduced the use of borosilicate glass. Ruffner was one of the first woman in the United States to create sculptures with borosilicate glass, which is commonly used in the manufacture of scientific glassware.

In lampworking or flameworking, a torch or lamp is used to melt glass, which is then blown and shaped with tools and by hand movements to create a sculptural form. Ruffner further developed her sculptures by painting them and by combining the lampworked glass with metals and other materials. By using a hard glass and working at higher temperatures, Ruffner was able to create much larger lampworked pieces. Through Ruffner's work, lampworking was first recognized as a medium for fine art.

Ruffner's series "Aesthetic Engineering: The Imagination Cycle" of sculptures was inspired by genetic engineering and the sharing of plant and animal genes. It was described as "an exuberant installation of glass, steel and bronze depicting explosive flowers, massive leaves and twisted growing vines". The exhibition has travelled extensively.

One of her public art projects, "Urban Garden" (2011), is a 27-foot high metal flowerpot, with flowers and moving petals, in downtown Seattle. The sculpture is also a kinetic water feature.

In Reforestation of the Imagination (2018) she combined sculpture in glass and bronze with augmented reality, so that digital images of imagined creatures could be overlaid on sculptural works.

== Works ==
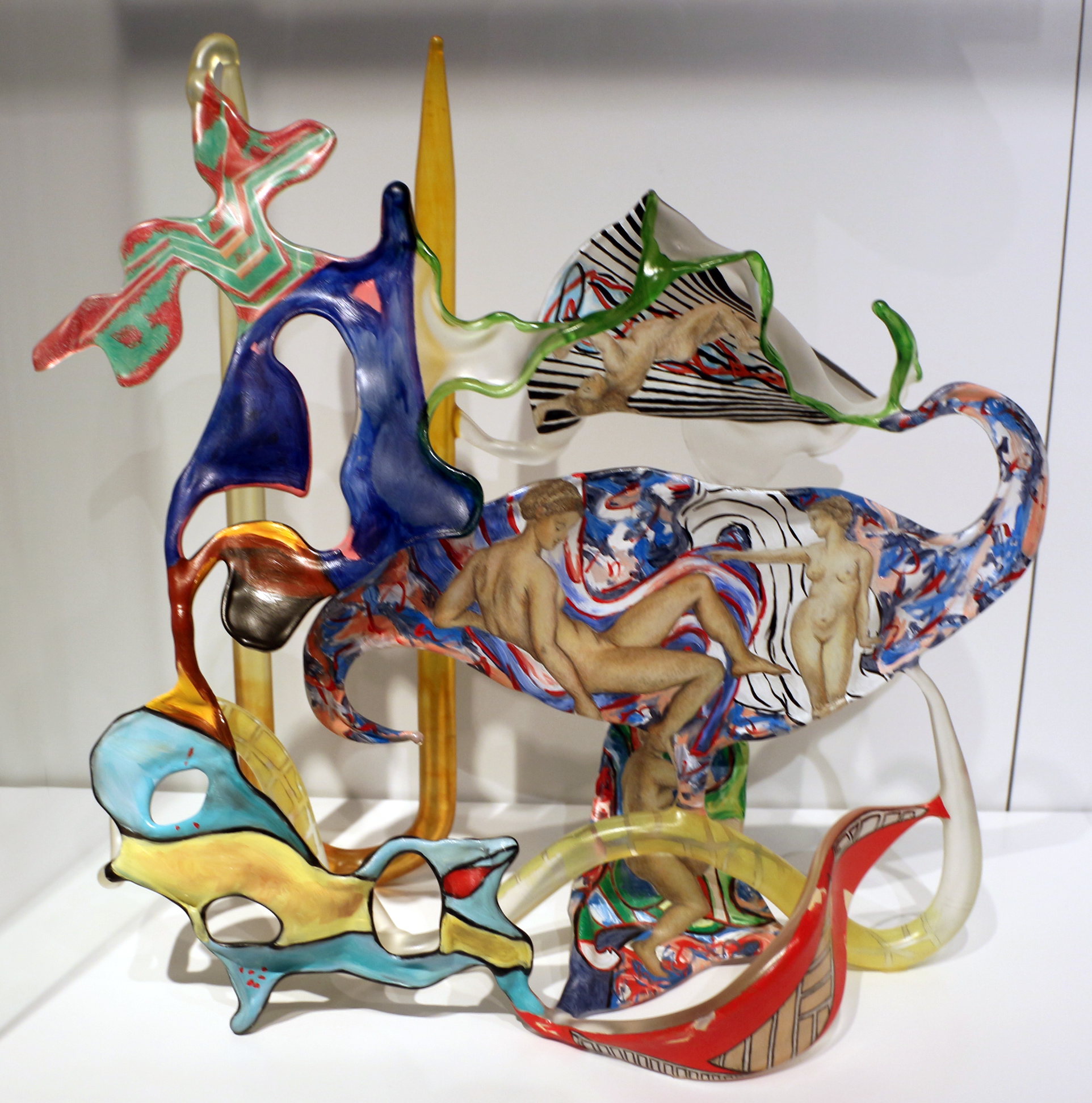
Stella at the Louvre, 1990

Through the use of lampworking she has developed a distinctive style, creating glass sculptures, mixed media installations and works of public art that are known for being "opulent, figurative, richly colored and metaphorical".

Ruffner's first solo exhibition was at Georgia Tech Gallery in Atlanta in 1984, followed by solo and group exhibitions at museums such as the Corning Museum of Glass; Museum of Arts and Design; Museum of Glass; Museum of Northwest Art; Renwick Gallery of the Smithsonian American Art Museum; Toledo Museum of Art; and Seattle's Traver Gallery, among others.

Her work is in the permanent collections of the Bergstrom-Mahler Museum of Glass, Carnegie Museum of Art, Cooper-Hewitt Museum, Corning Museum of Glass, Detroit Institute of Art, Fort Wayne Museum of Art; Metropolitan Museum of Art; New Mexico Museum of Art; Seattle Art Museum, and the Smithsonian Museum of American Art. Her work is included in the United States Art in Embassies Program.

She was profiled on the NPR show Weekend America on March 18, 2006.

She was the subject of a documentary, Ginny Ruffer: A Not So Still Life (2010), which won the Golden Space Needle Award - Best Documentary at the Seattle International Film Festival that year.

== Personal life and death ==
In 1975, she married Charles Emory Nail, divorced in 1980, and married Robert Edward Ruffner later that year.

Entering her thirties, Ginny Ruffner scored high enough on an IQ test to be accepted to Mensa and Intertel, two high-IQ societies.

In 1991, Ruffner was involved in a life-threatening three-car collision. She was in a coma for five weeks. When she finally recovered consciousness, she could not speak, walk, or remember that she was an artist. Doctors doubted that she would walk or talk again. But after a year of extensive physical, speech, and vision therapy, Ruffner was able to return to work. She credits her recovery to being "stubborn and bullheaded". She spent the next five years in a wheelchair, but eventually was able to walk again. The accident left her with speech and mobility issues. She rediscovered her own work, in part through the book Why Not?: The Art of Ginny Ruffner (1995) and then revisioned it, juxtaposing materials in ways that balanced "beauty with danger".

Ginny Ruffner died at her home on January 20, 2025, at the age of 72.
