= Roy McMakin =

- Born: Roy McMakin; 1956 (age 69–70); Lander, Wyoming, United States
- Education: University of California, San Diego (BA) (MA)

Roy McMakin, Untitled (Wooden Toilet), 2005, oiled holly, 66 x 32 x 30 inches.

Roy McMakin (born 1956 in Lander, Wyoming) is a San Diego–based artist, designer, furniture maker, and architect.

== Biography ==
He began his studies at the Museum Art School in Portland, but soon transferred to the University of California, San Diego, where he completed a BA in 1979 and an MA in 1982. At UCSD, he studied conceptual art making, under the likes of Allan Kaprow, Manny Farber, Jean-Pierre Gorin, and Patricia Patterson. In 1987, he opened his first showroom on Los Angeles' Beverly Boulevard, called Domestic Furniture Co. Though the showroom closed in 1995, it remains online today and has resumed production with Big Leaf Manufacturing. Additionally, his work has been featured in solo-exhibitions at galleries and museums, he has designed entire houses, and increased the production of his furniture for his showroom. His most recent retrospective was a 20-year survey of the sculptor and furniture designer's oeuvre at the University of Washington's Henry Art Gallery in 2005.

=== Influences ===
McMakin's furniture hints at influences from particular architects, designers, artists, and larger trends in American furniture design. His designs echo the Arts and Crafts tradition, Shaker designs, Art Deco and '50s Functional styles, and even mass-produced American commercial furniture. He also admired architect Irving Gill, a pioneer of early 20th century pre-modern design, the sensitive wood worker, George Nakashima, and artist Scott Burton. In fact, he lived in the 1917 Hancock Park house designed by Irving Gill. Of Gill's house, McMakin said "It seems to be charged with the element of time, that domesticates whatever was off or unusual about the work when it first appeared. […] Small, simple houses need to come back in. We need to be more sparing in the way we spend our natural resources. We need to be caring about the natural limits of our environment." His professor, Allan Kaprow, taught him the basics of conceptual art making and provided him with an artistic community in which to experiment. Some critics have likened his taste for minimalism to the great minimalist artists, such as Sol Lewitt and Donald Judd. While other historians have placed him in an artistic lineage that includes West Coast natives John McLaughlin, Robert Irwin, and Charles Ray.

== Exhibition History ==
2016

- Roy McMakin: A Table, Garth Greenan Gallery, September 29–November 12

== Selected bibliography ==
- Johnson, Ken (October 21, 2005). "Art in Review; Roy McMakin". The New York Times.
