= List of public art in Seattle =

List of public artworks in Seattle, Washington, U.S.

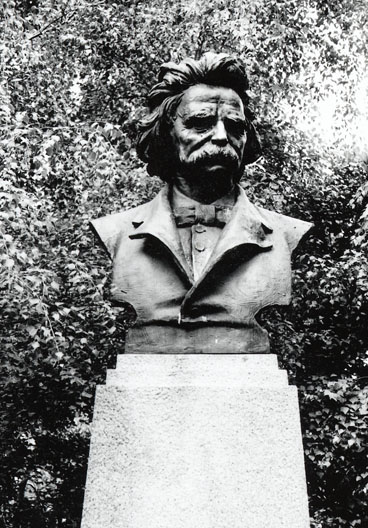
Bust of Edvard Grieg

Seattle, Washington, has more than 400 permanent pieces of public artwork throughout the city, supported by private collections and the municipal Percent for Art program, which directs one percent of funding for capital improvement projects into artwork. In 2013, the collection's permanent and portable works were valued at a total of $39 million.

== Sculpture ==
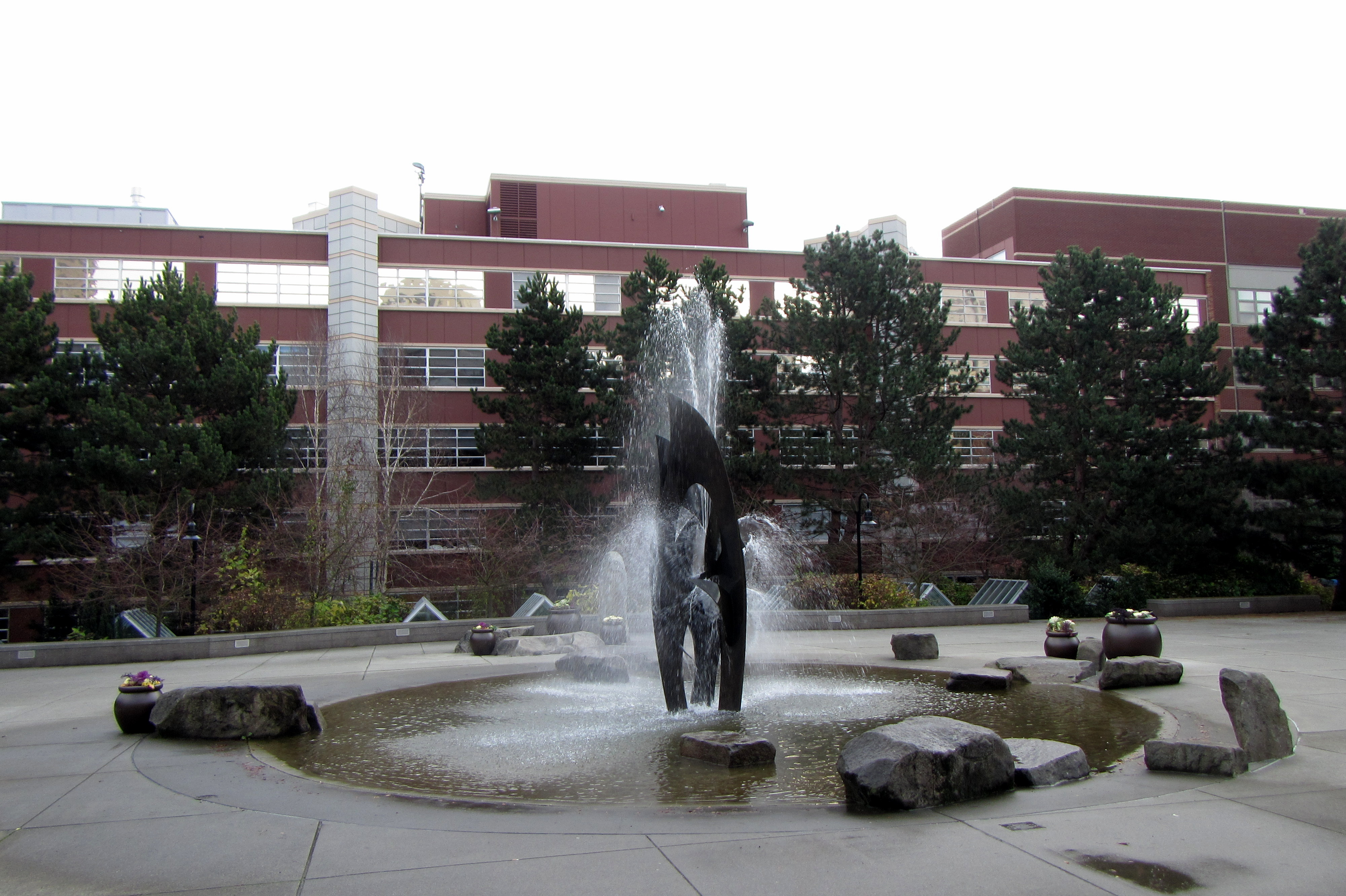
Centennial Fountain

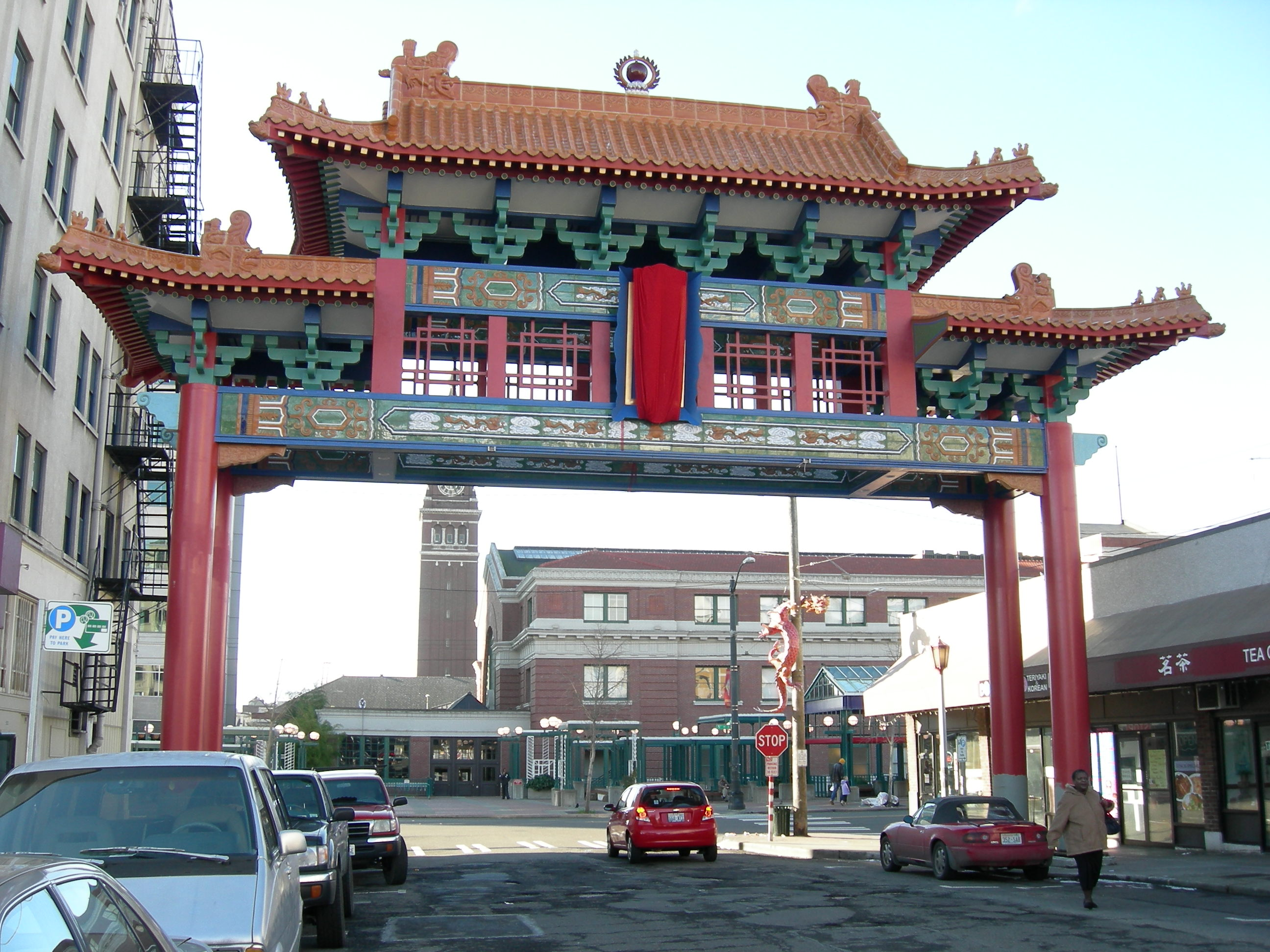
Historic Chinatown Gate

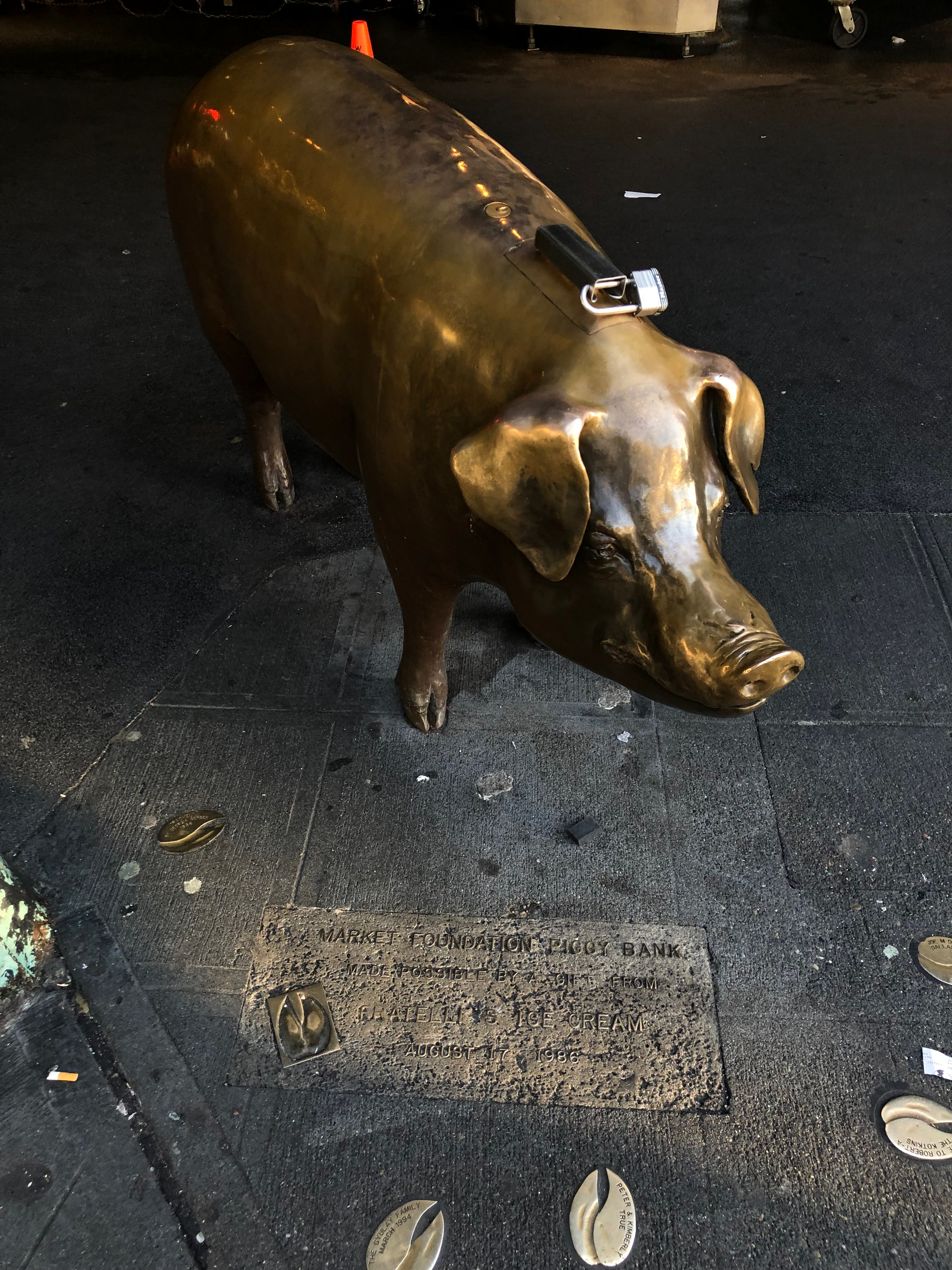
Rachel

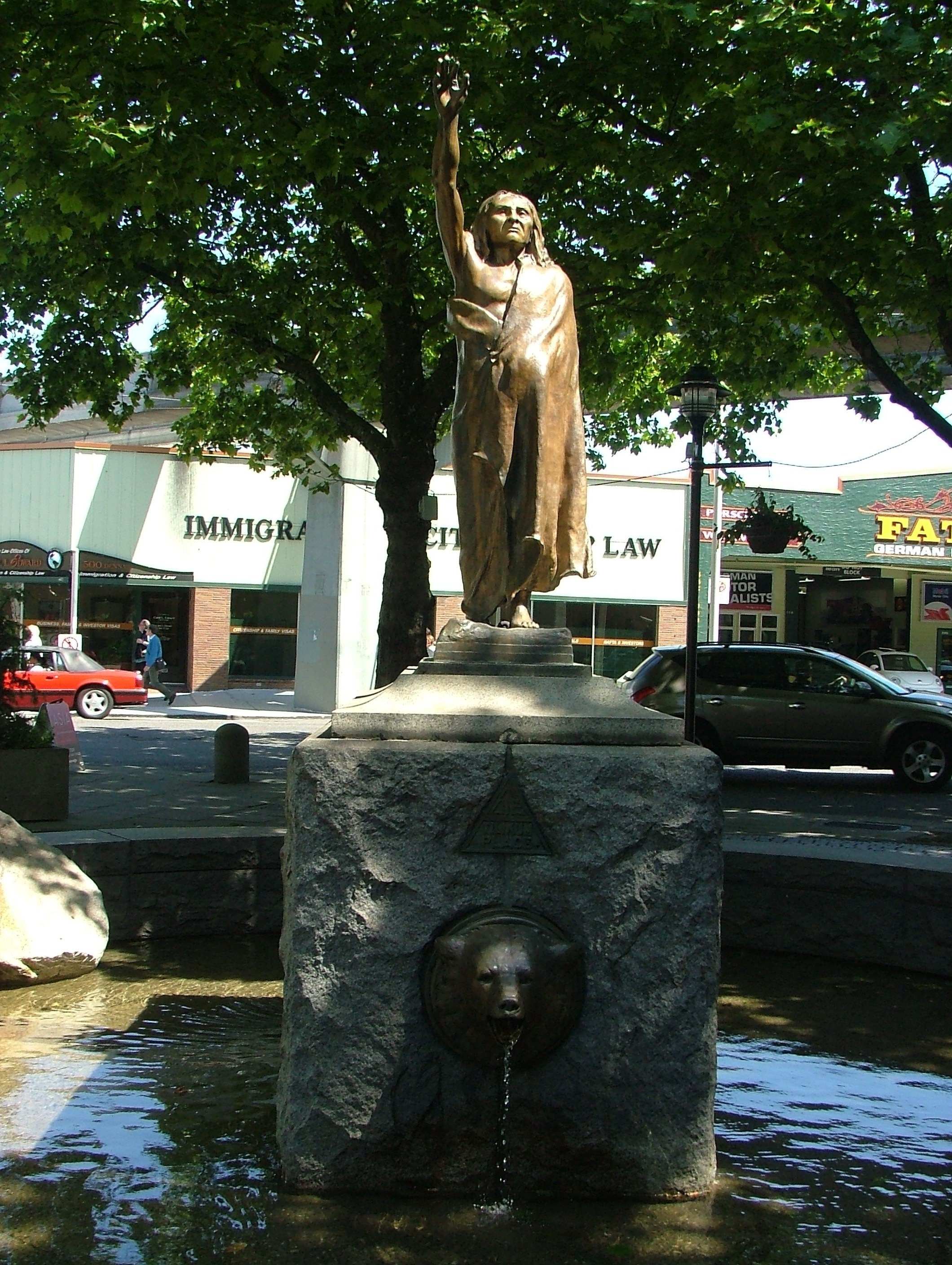
Statue of Chief Seattle

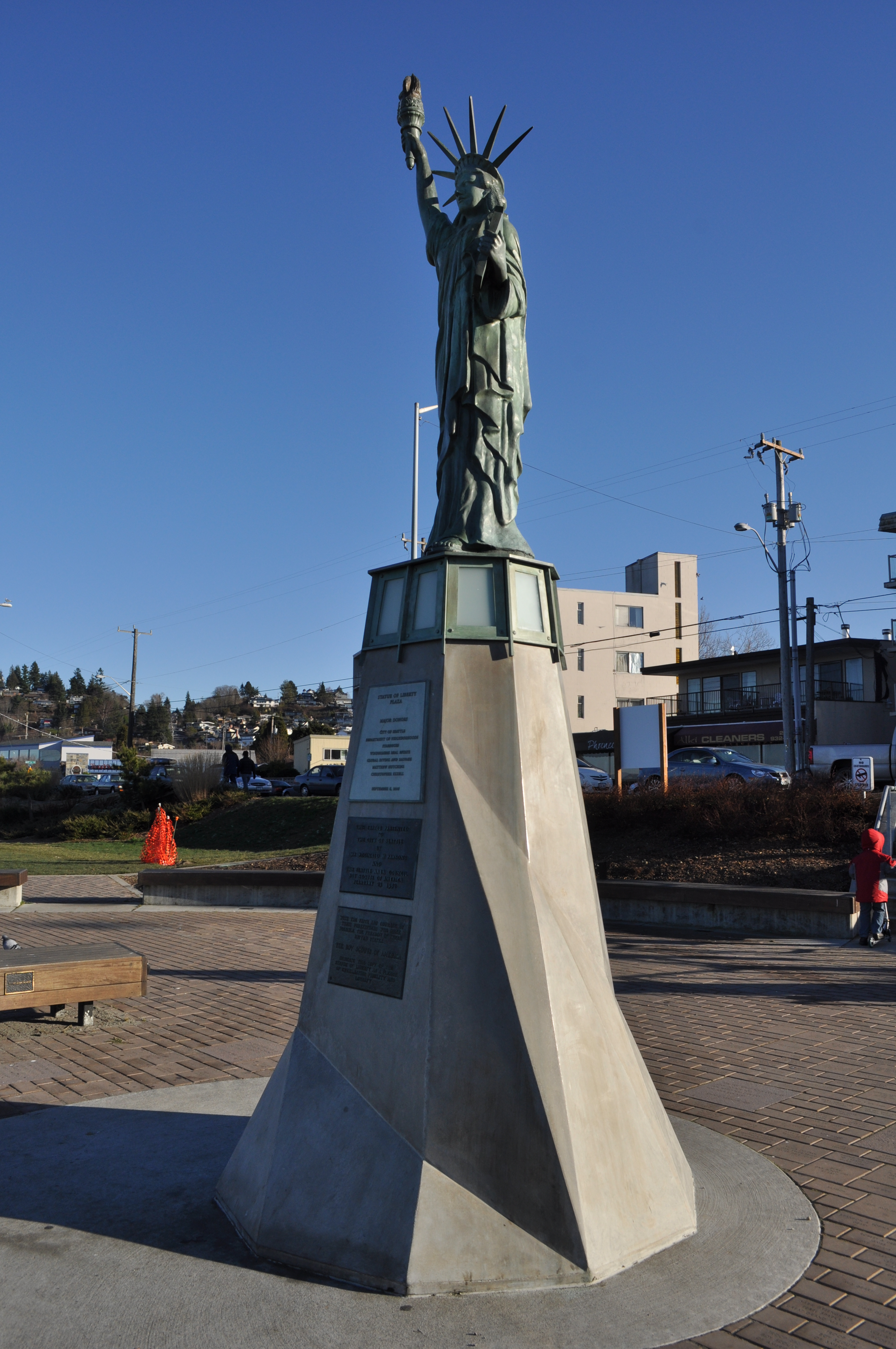
Statue of Liberty

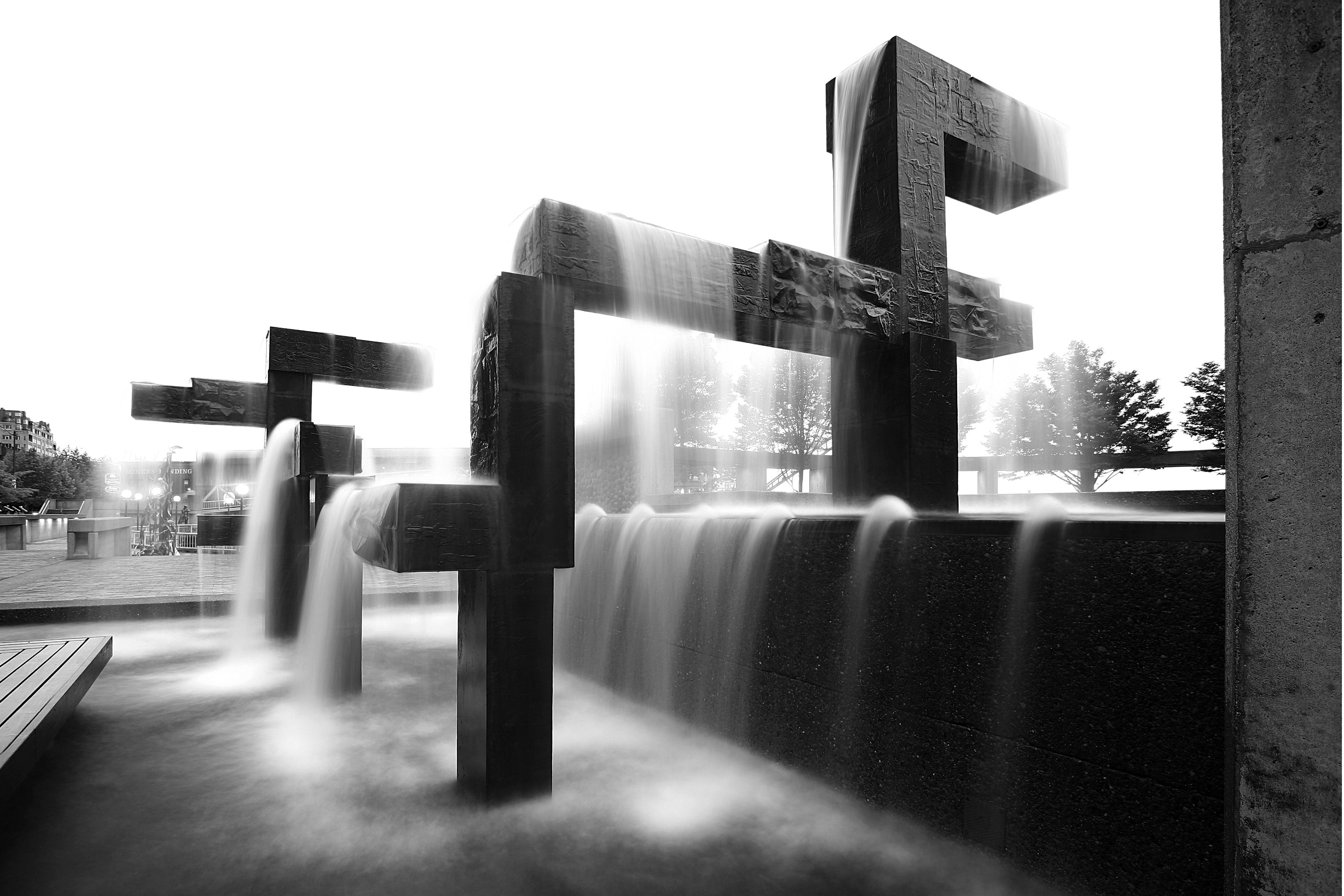
Waterfront Fountain

- A Sound Garden (1982–1983), Douglas Hollis
- Adam
- Adjacent, Against, Upon (1976)
- American Doughboy Bringing Home Victory (1932), Alonzo Victor Lewis
- Angie's Umbrella (2003)
- Birthplace of Seattle Monument (1905)
- Black Lightning
- Black Sun (1969), Isamu Noguchi
- Broken Obelisk, Barnett Newman
- Bust of Edvard Grieg, Finn Frolich
- Bust of James J. Hill
- Bust of Mark A. Matthews (1941), Alonzo Victor Lewis
- Centennial Fountain
- Changing Form
- Chief of the Suquamish – Chief Seattle (1909), James A. Wehn
- Dancer with Flat Hat, Phillip Levine
- Dancer's Series: Steps (1979), Jack Mackie and Charles Greening
- The Electric Lady Studio Guitar, Daryl Smith
- The Emperor Has No Balls
- Fallen Firefighters Memorial (1998), Hai Ying Wu
- Farmer's Pole (1984)
- Fountain of Creation
- Fountain of Reflection
- Fountain of the Northwest
- Fountain of Wisdom
- Fremont Rocket
- Fremont Troll (1990)
- Grass Blades (2002)
- Hammering Man (1991), Jonathan Borofsky
- Hat 'n' Boots
- Henry M. Jackson
- Historic Chinatown Gate
- Homeless Jesus
- Impatient Optimist
- International Fountain
- Ivar Feeding the Gulls (1988)
- Jet Kiss (2015), Mike Ross
- Joshua Green Fountain
- Kobe Bell
- Lady Rainier
- Loo Wit
- Lundeberg Derby Monument
- Made in USA (2005), Michael Davis
- Mirall (2015)
- The Mitt (1999), T-Mobile Park
- Moses (2/3), Tony Smith
- Moss Turtle (2021), Michiko Tanaka
- Naramore Fountain
- Nine Spaces Nine Trees
- Olympic Iliad
- Pioneer Square totem pole
- Prefontaine Fountain
- Rachel
- The Red Popsicle (2011)
- Statue of Sadako Sasaki, Peace Park
- Sasquatch Pushing Over a House
- Seattle Center Totem (1970)
- Seattle Fishermen's Memorial
- Seattle Garden (1988) by Ann Sperry
- Seattle George Monument
- Seattle Monolith
- Shear Draft (1995)
- Sonic Bloom (2013), Dan Corson
- Soul Pole
- Statue of Chief Seattle (1912), James Wehn
- Statue of Chris Cornell (2018), Seattle Center
- Statue of Christopher Columbus
- Statue of Don James
- Statue of George Washington (1909), Lorado Taft
- Statue of Jim Owens
- Statue of John McGraw (1912), Richard E. Brooks
- Statue of Leif Erikson
- Statue of Lenin
- Statue of Liberty
- Statue of Sun Yat-sen
- Statue of William H. Seward
- Straight Shot (2007)
- Thomas Burke Monument
- Three Piece Sculpture: Vertebrae
- Typewriter Eraser, Scale X
- United Confederate Veterans Memorial
- Untitled (Lee Kelly, 1975)
- Untitled (Shapiro, 1990), Seattle University
- Untitled Totem Pole (1984)
- Urban Garden
- Waiting for the Interurban
- The Wall of Death
- Waterfront Fountain (1974)
- Waterworks
- Wind Cradle

=== Olympic Sculpture Park ===
The following artworks have been installed in Olympic Sculpture Park:

- Bunyon's Chess
- Curve XXIV
- Eagle (1971), Alexander Calder
- Echo
- Eye Benches I, II and III
- Father and Son (2005), Louise Bourgeois
- Love & Loss
- Mary's Invitation – A Place to Regard Beauty (2014), Ginny Ruffner
- Neukom Vivarium
- Perre's Ventaglio III
- Persephone Unbound
- Riviera
- Schubert Sonata
- Seattle Cloud Cover
- Sky Landscape I
- Split
- Stinger
- Two Plane Vertical Horizontal Variation III (1973), George Rickey
- Untitled (McMakin)
- Wake
- Wandering Rocks

== Murals ==
The Seattle Mural is installed at Seattle Center. West Seattle has 11 outdoor murals that were created in the early 1990s and restored in 2018. Black Lives Matter street murals were painted in Capitol Hill and outside Seattle City Hall in 2020 and 2021, respectively. The People's Wall is located in the city's Central District. A "whaling wall" by Robert Wyland has been painted on the exterior of The Edgewater.

A 775-foot-long (236 m) mural facing Elliott Way and Pike Place Market was painted by Victor Ash in June 2024 on the back side of three buildings that abutted the former Alaskan Way Viaduct. It depicts sea creatures and animals that are up to 55 feet (17 m) tall. The mural and its companion piece by Adry del Rocio were described as the "largest outdoor mural in North America" at the time of their unveiling.

== See also ==
- AIDS Memorial Pathway
- List of Whaling Walls
- Northwest Trolls: Way of the Bird King
- Rainbow crossings in Seattle
