= Statue of Sun Yat-sen =

Statue of Sun Yat-sen may refer to:

- Statue of Sun Yat-sen (Los Angeles)
- Statue of Sun Yat-sen (Melbourne), 2011
- Statue of Sun Yat-sen (New York City), by Lu Chun-Hsiung and Michael Kang
- Statue of Sun Yat-sen (San Francisco), 1937, by Beniamino Bufano
- Statue of Sun Yat-sen (Seattle), 2018

== See also ==
- Sun Yat-sen#Cultural references
