= Black Lightning (disambiguation) =

Black Lightning is a DC Comics superhero who first appeared in 1977.

Black Lightning may also refer to:

- Vincent Black Lightning, a UK-made motorcycle produced 1948–1952
  - "1952 Vincent Black Lightning", a song referencing the Vincent motorcycle, by Richard Thompson on his 1991 album Rumor and Sigh
- Black Lightning (TV series), a CW TV series that premiered in 2018
  - Jefferson Pierce (Arrowverse), the protagonist and title character of the TV series
- Black Lightning (1924 film), a Clara Bow silent film about a heroic German Shepherd dog similar to Strongheart or Rin-Tin-Tin
- Black Lightning (2009 film), a 2009 Russian superhero film, unrelated to the DC Comics character
- Black Lightning (novel), a novel by Dymphna Cusack
- Black Lightning (radio serial), a 1952 Australian radio serial
- Black Lightning (sculpture), a 1981 stainless steel sculpture by Ronald Bladen
- A fictional weather phenomenon that contributed to Flight 828 traveling through time in the NBC/Netflix production Manifest (TV series)
