= Rachel (Gerber) =

Bronze sculpture in Seattle, Washington, U.S.

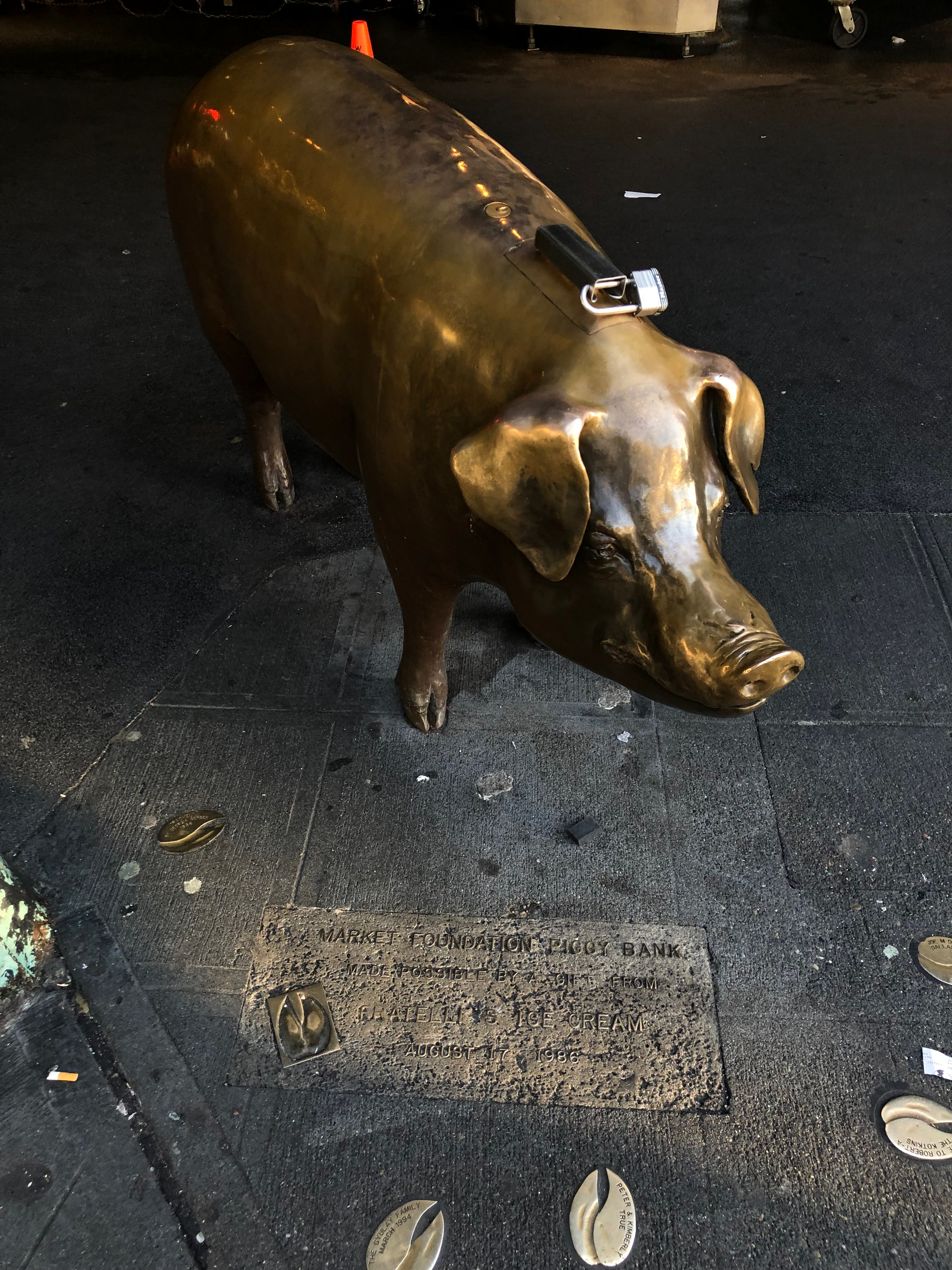
- The sculpture and bronze footprints in 2019
- Artist: Georgia Gerber
- Year: 1986
- Type: Sculpture
- Medium: Bronze
- Subject: Piggy bank
- Condition: "Well maintained" (1995)
- Location: Seattle, Washington, United States; 47°36′31″N 122°20′27″W

Rachel, also known as Market Foundation Piggy Bank, Rachael the Pig, Rachel the Pig or Rachel the Piggy Bank, is an outdoor bronze sculpture of a piggy bank, designed by Georgia Gerber and located at Pike Place Market in Seattle, Washington, in the United States. It was dedicated on August 17, 1986, the market's 79th birthday, and is maintained by the Pike Place Market Foundation. Modeled after a pig (also named Rachel) that lived on Whidbey Island and was the 1985 Island County prize-winner. In 2006 Rachel received roughly $9,000 annually while in 2018, donations increased to $20,000. The money is collected by the Market Foundation to fund the Market's social services.

== Description ==
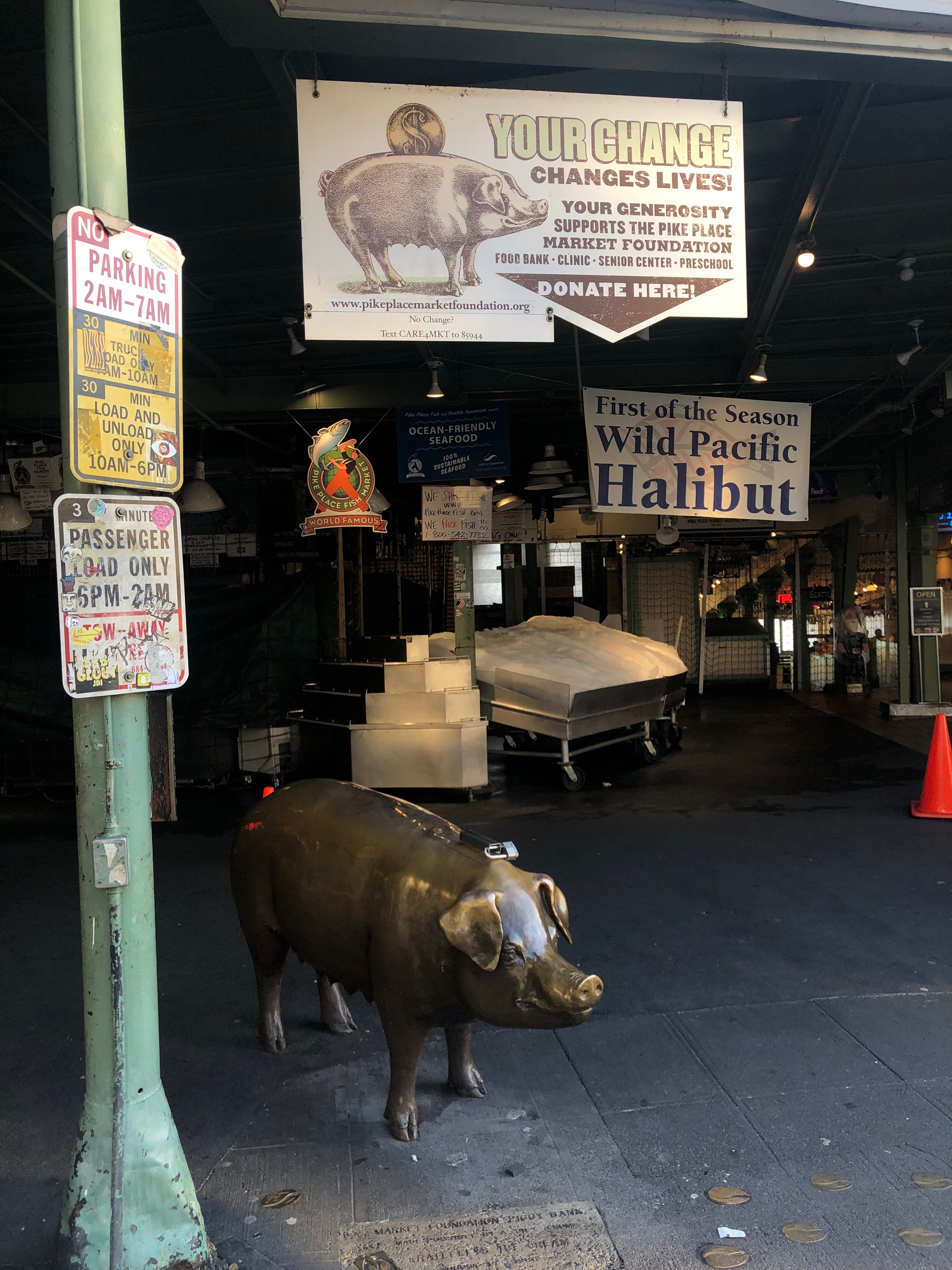
The statue in 2019

The Smithsonian Institution describes Rachel as a "life-size, realistic figure" of a sow piggy bank. The Pike Place Market Foundation calls it the "mascot" of Pike Place Market. The bronze sculpture depicts a pig with a money slot on the top of its head and measures approximately 36 by 66 by 16 inches (91 cm × 168 cm × 41 cm) and weighs 550 pounds (250 kg).

Bronze footprints are on the sidewalk leading to the pig figure. One nearby plaque reads: "Market Foundation Piggy Bank. Made possible by a gift from Fratelli's Ice Cream, August 17, 1986". Another states that money deposited into the piggy bank benefits local human service organizations.

== History ==
The sculpture was surveyed by the Smithsonian's Save Outdoor Sculpture! program in April 1995 and was deemed "well maintained".

On February 5, 2011, Rachel was struck by a taxicab and was knocked off its concrete base. The sculpture suffered cosmetic damage, including a 10 inches (25 cm) crack along the left ear and a dent on its left side, and was repaired at Gerber's studio on Whidbey Island. Rachel returned to the Pike Place Market on March 18, 2011, after a tour of Seattle landmarks in a vintage farm truck.

Rachel was joined by a "cousin" named Billie, installed in July 2011 at the Western Avenue entrance to the market.

== See also ==
- Pigs in popular culture
