= Seattle Garden =

Sculpture by Ann Sperry in Seattle, Washington, U.S.

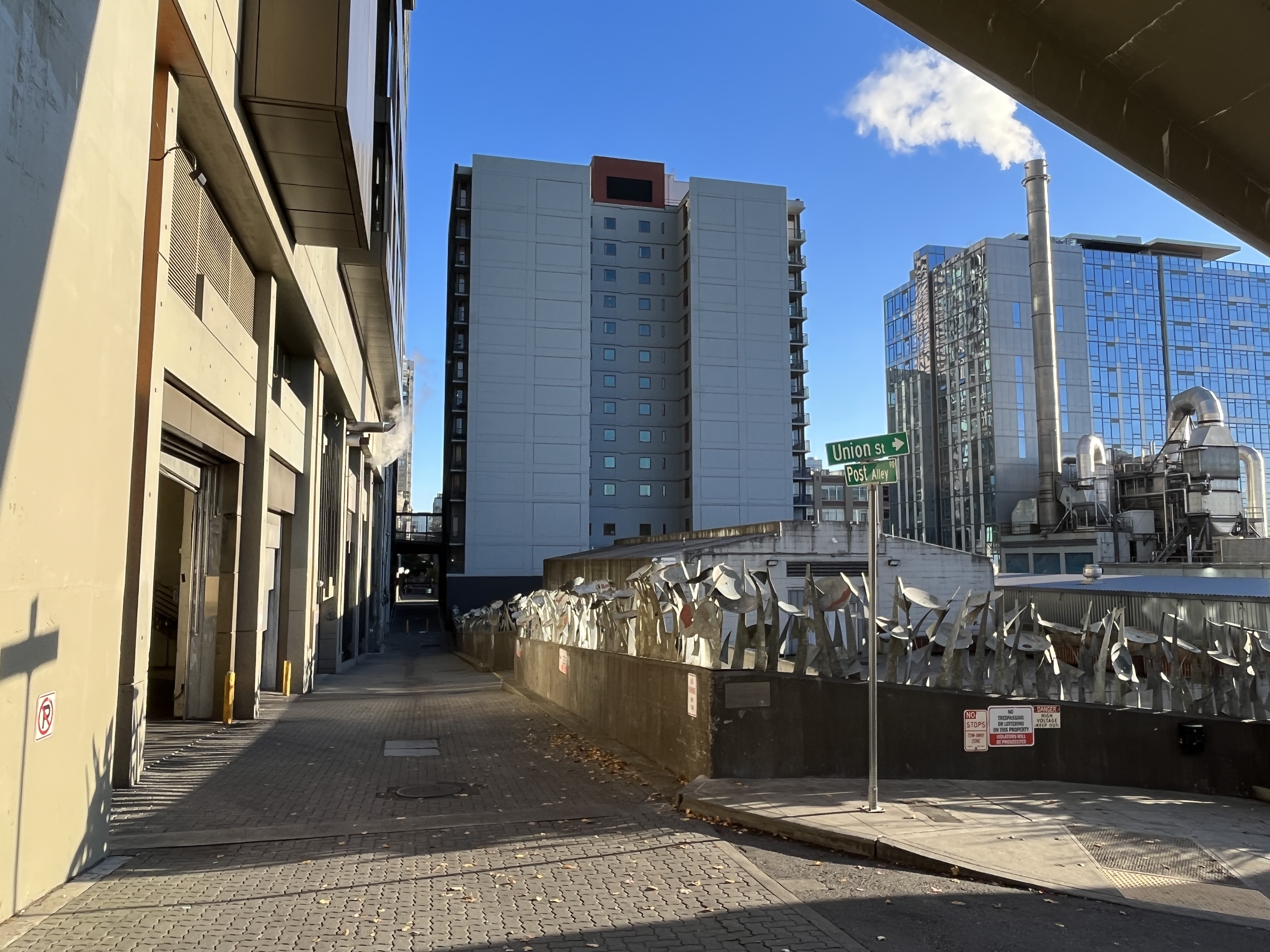
- The sculpture at the intersection of Post Alley and Union Street, 2022
- Artist: Ann Sperry
- Year: 1988
- Medium: Steel sculpture
- Location: Seattle, Washington, U.S.
- 47°36′26″N 122°20′22″W

Seattle Garden is a 1988 painted steel sculpture by Ann Sperry, installed in Seattle, Washington. The work is approximately 4 ft, 5 in tall and 334 ft long. It runs along two sides of the Seattle City Light Union Street Substation, on Post Alley between Union and University Streets.

In 2003, Stewart Oksenhorn of The Aspen Times wrote, "What might be [Sperry's] most impressive work was designed as functional art. In the mid-'80s, Sperry won a competition sponsored by the Seattle Arts Commission Percent for Art Program, which resulted in 1988's Seattle Garden, a 334-foot long installation bordering a downtown Seattle power substation. The aim was to prevent kids from climbing onto the substation grounds. Sperry's sharp-edged, flower-inspired metal work not only served the purpose, but also beautified the neighborhood." According to Sperry, the artwork has not been subject to much vandalism because of its appearance. She has said, "If it were New York, they would have put up chain-link fence. Because it was Seattle, they had an art competition."
