= Urban Garden (sculpture) =

Sculpture in Seattle, Washington, U.S.

- The sculpture in 2022
- Artist: Ginny Ruffner
- Year: 2011
- Location: Seattle, Washington, U.S.
- 47°36′38.4″N 122°19′57.7″W

Urban Garden is a sculpture by Ginny Ruffner, installed in Seattle, Washington, United States. It depicts a pot, flowers, and watering can. The 27-foot-tall kinetic sculpture was commissioned by the Sheraton Seattle Hotel and weighs approximately 10,000 pounds. The pot is 9 feet tall and 7 feet wide.

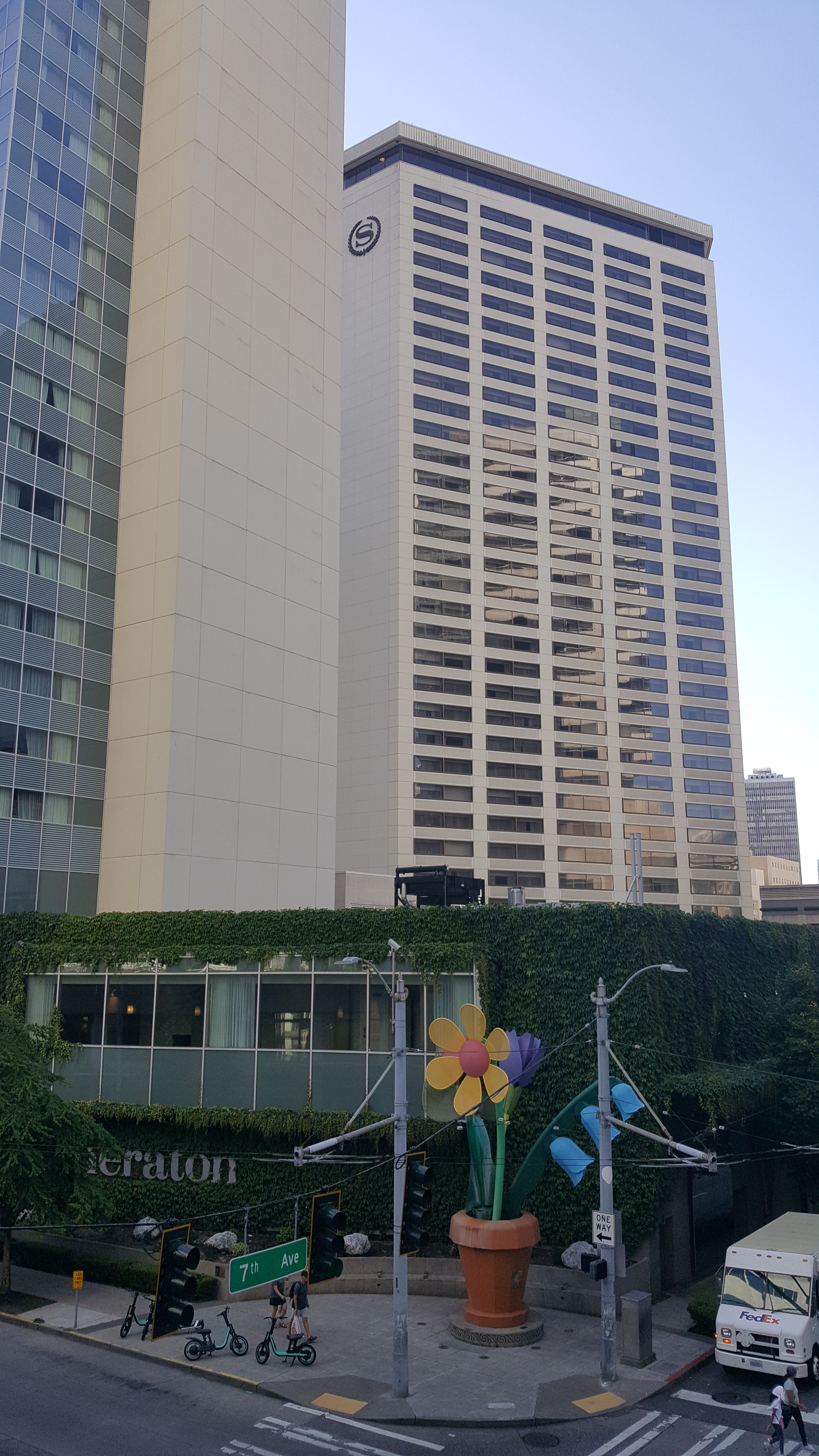
The sculpture in 2022

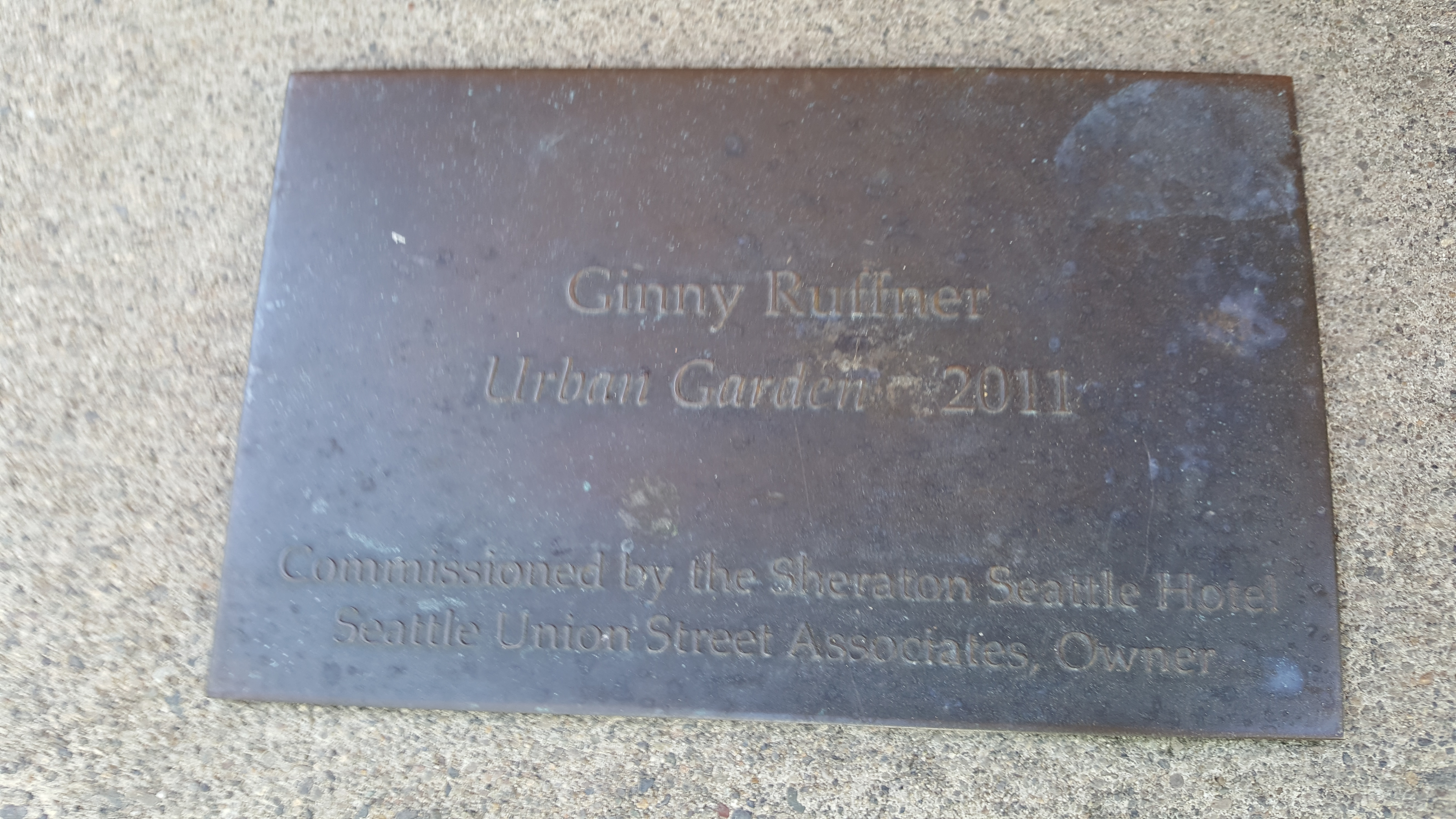
Plaque
