= Shear Draft =

Sculpture in Seattle, Washington, U.S.

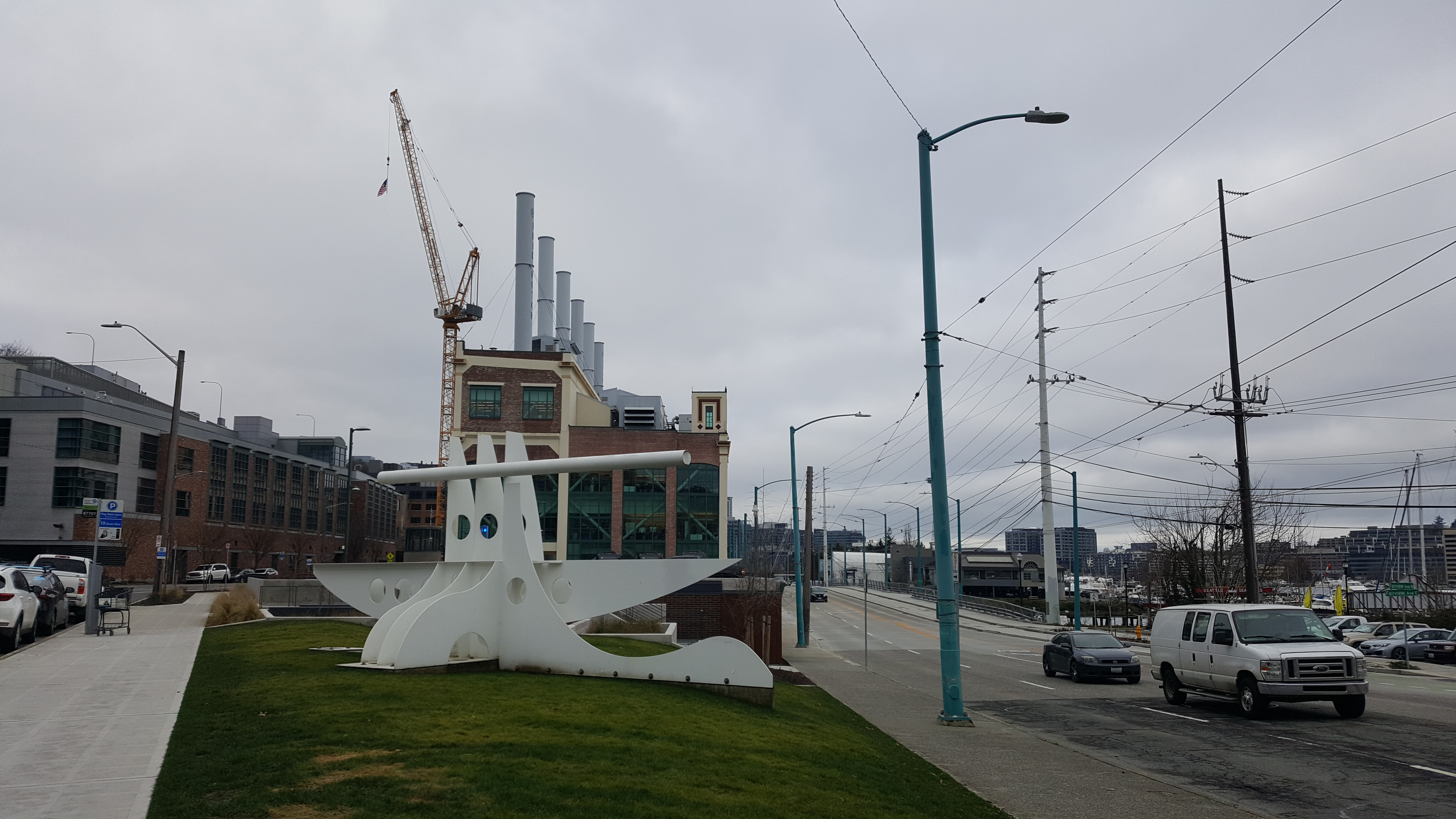
- The sculpture in 2022
- Artist: Thomas Lindsey
- Year: 1995
- Medium: Steel sculpture
- Location: Seattle, Washington, U.S.
- 47°37′55″N 122°19′35″W

Shear Draft is a steel sculpture by Thomas Lindsey, installed in Seattle, Washington, United States.

== Description and history ==
The sculpture is located at the intersection of Eastlake Avenue and Fairview East, in Seattle's South Lake Union neighborhood near Eastlake. According to Jean Godden of The Seattle Times, the artist "drew inspiration for the design from the neighborhood's maritime origins and from the fact that Boeing once built seaplanes on nearby Lake Union" The sculpture was funded by Seattle Department of Neighborhoods and fabricated at Lake Union Dry Dock. Zymogenetics Inc. made the land available. Lindsey suffered a back injury during assembly. A "grand celebration" was held for the artwork on November 17, 1995.

== Reception ==
Jean Godden of The Seattle Times called the work "striking".

== See also ==
- 1995 in art
