= Nine Spaces Nine Trees =

Art installation by Robert Irwin in Seattle, Washington, U.S.

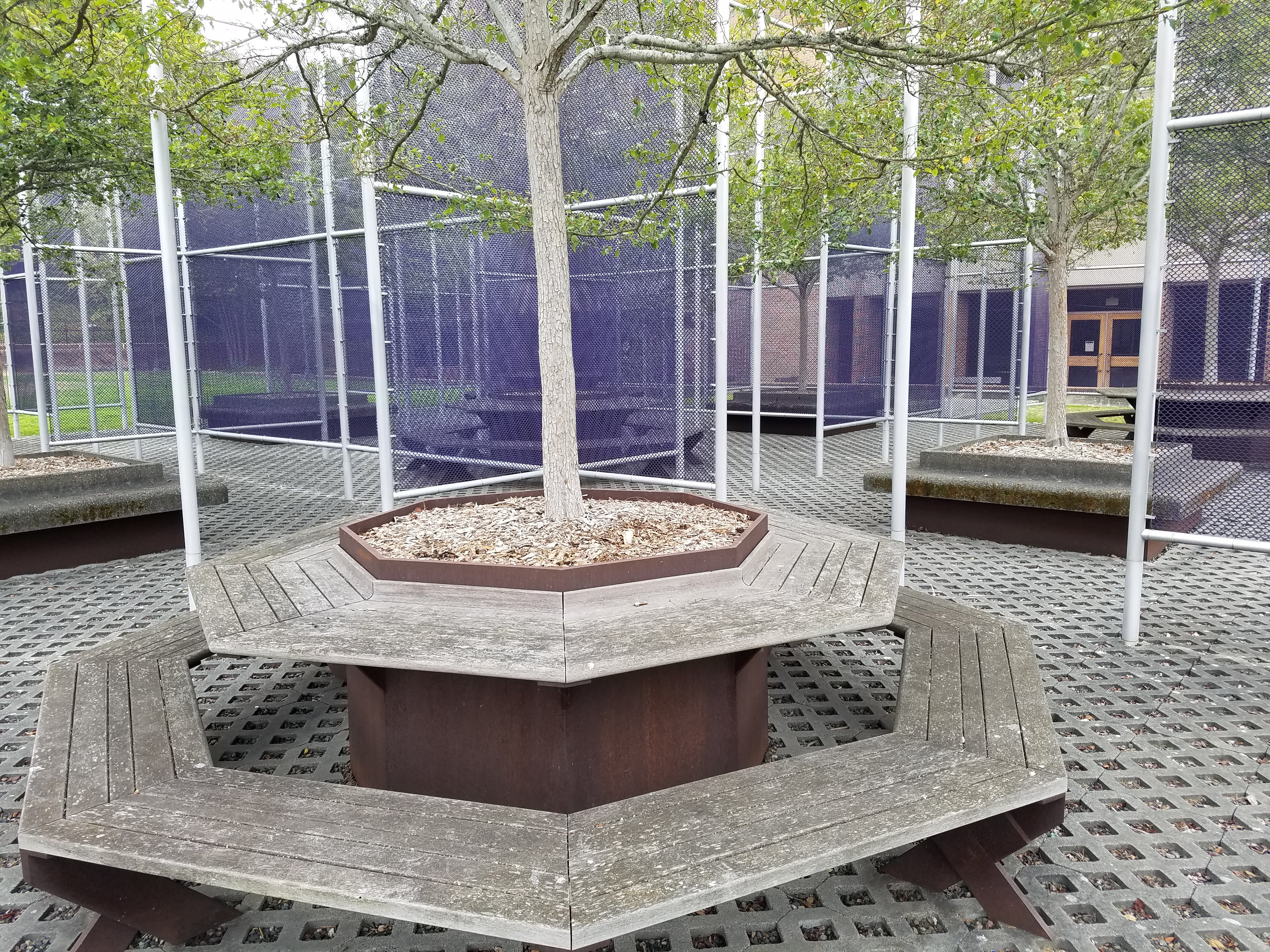
- Interior view, 2021
- Artist: Robert Irwin
- Year: 1982–1983
- Condition: "Well maintained" (1995)
- Location: Seattle, Washington, United States; 47°39′23″N 122°18′40″W

Nine Spaces Nine Trees (occasionally referred to as Nine Spaces, Nine Trees or 9 Spaces 9 Trees) is a 1982–1983 art installation by American artist Robert Irwin, located on the University of Washington campus in Seattle, Washington, in the United States. Upon its initial creation, Nine Spaces Nine Trees has a history of occupancy in the Seattle area. It was recreated in 2007. Irwin intended the work to stand for both public and private places and how they coincide.

== Description ==
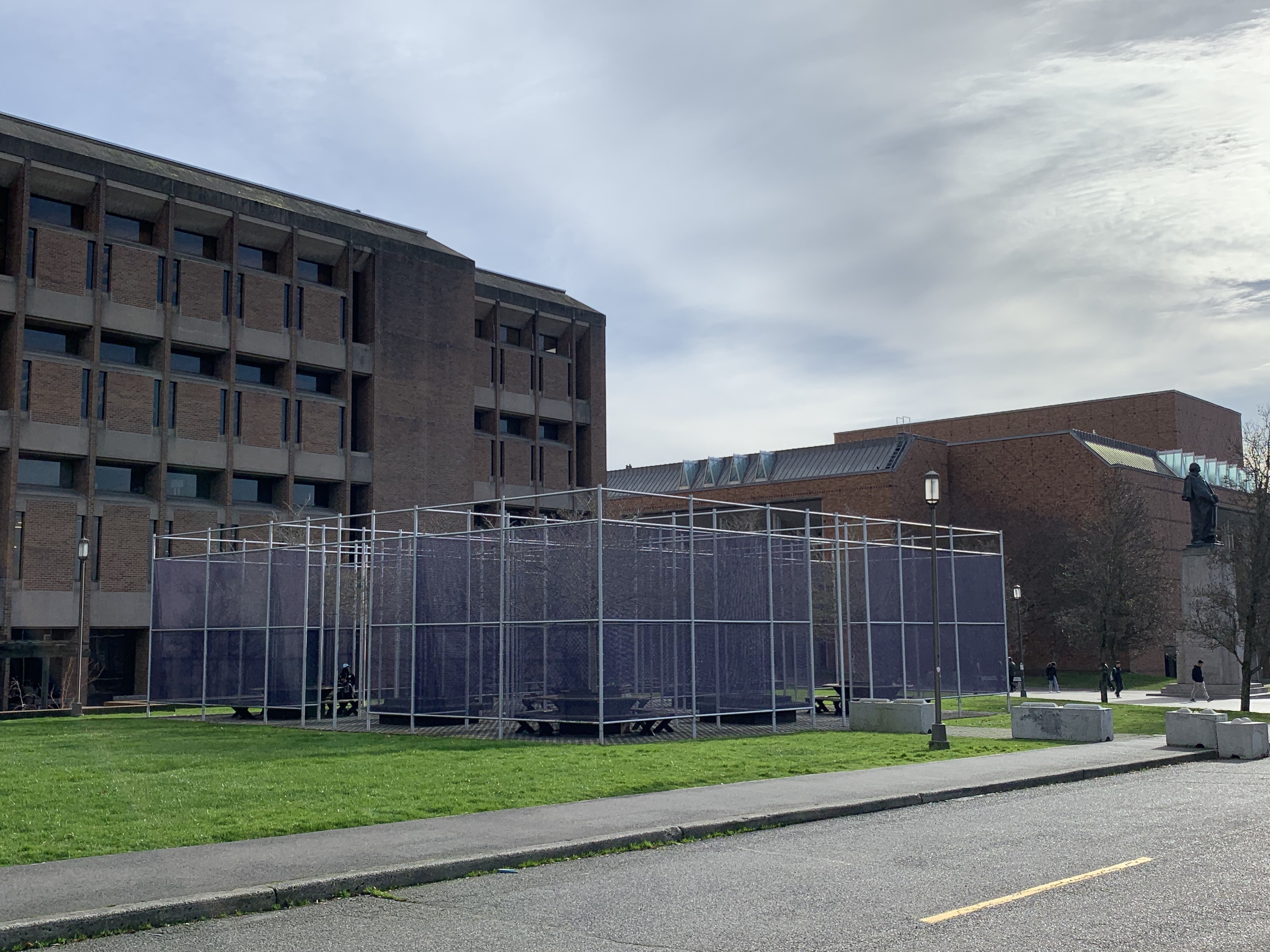
South-East exterior view, 2023

Nine Spaces Nine Trees was intended to create symbolic spaces that are both private and public. When light passes through the fenced walls of the installation, movement and patterns are created and thus can either become an area of calm and relaxation or can cause a slight feeling of claustrophobia. Depending on where you are sat and how you are facing the fenced in walls, the walls will either become see-through or semi-solid.

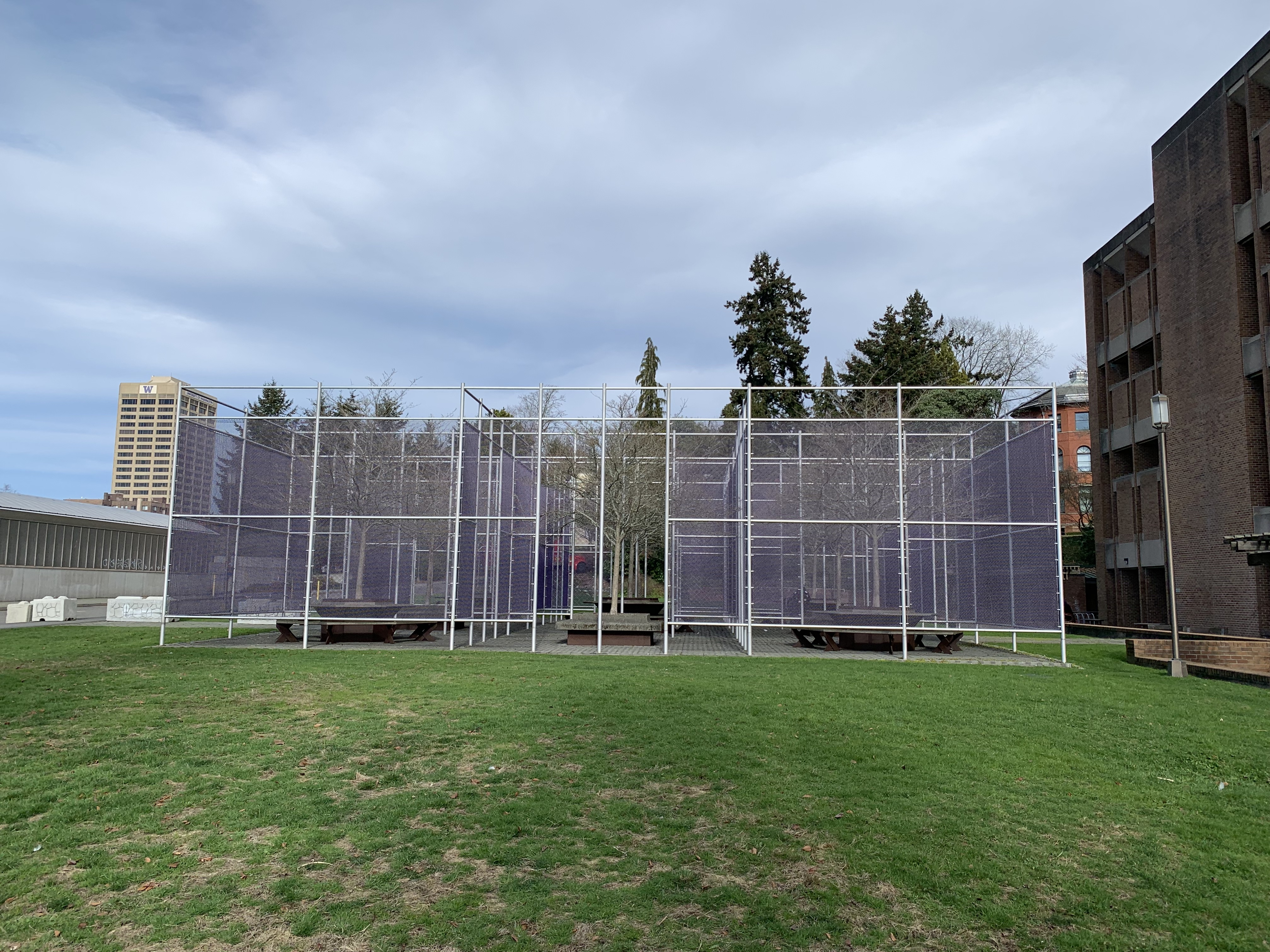
North exterior view, 2023

== History ==
The art installation, made in 1983 by Robert Irwin, was originally placed on the rooftop plaza of the City of Seattle's Public Safety Building. Reconstruction on the building forced the art installation to be permanently removed. In 2003, it was then moved to the University of Washington campus adjacent to the Odegaard Undergraduate Library. The modern installation is a recreation inspired by the original work, rather than an exact replica.

== Materials and construction process ==
The University of Washington Facilities Services devoted most of the summer of 2006 to preparing the ground for the reconstruction of the art installation. Preparation of the ground for the installation included planting new grass and creating a new irrigation system. When the University of Washington had shown interest in having the installation be recreated on campus, Irwin helped select the site but he then substantially adjusted the design. The original installment utilized red flowering plum trees but Irwin replaced them with Winter King Hawthornes in the adapted version. In addition to changing the species of tree, he used new octagonal benches that surround some of the trees and the mesh fences were converted from the blue-colored material to a purple. The installation was surveyed and deemed "well maintained" by the Smithsonian Institution's "Save Outdoor Sculpture!" program in 1995.

== See also ==
- 1983 in art
- 2007 in art
- Campus of the University of Washington
