= Statue of Jim Owens =

Sculpture in Seattle, Washington, U.S.

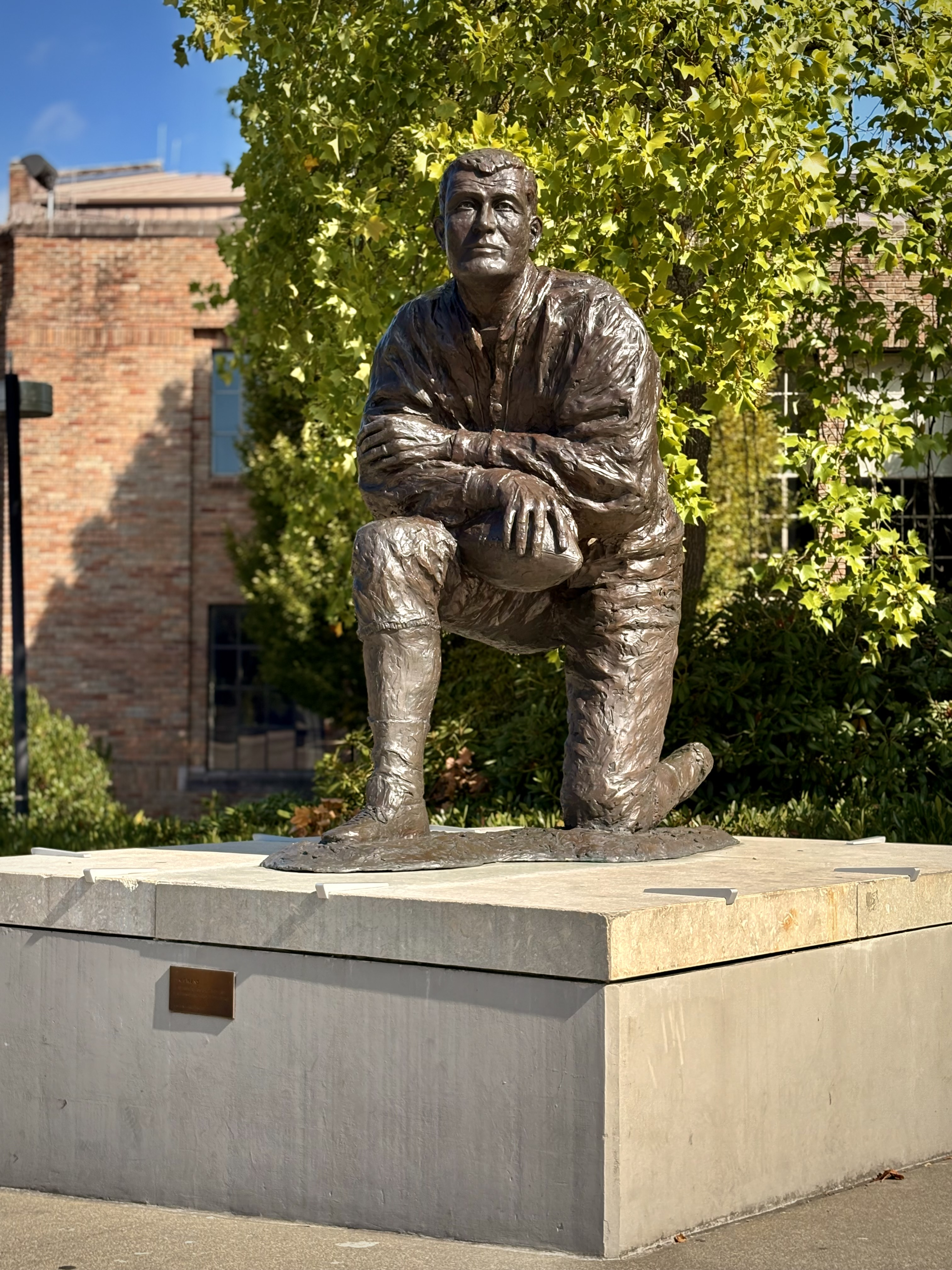
- Subject: Jim Owens
- Location: Seattle, Washington, U.S.; 47°39′5.6″N 122°18′10.1″W

A statue of American football player and coach Jim Owens is installed outside Husky Stadium on the University of Washington campus, in Seattle, Washington. Fans and formerly Washington Huskies football players helped raise $55,000 for the sculpture, which was unveiled in 2003.
