= Wind Cradle =

Sculpture in Seattle, Washington, U.S.

- The sculpture in 2022
- Artist: Ali Baudoin
- Year: 1976
- Type: Sculpture
- Medium: Stainless steel
- Condition: "Treatment needed" (1994)
- Location: Seattle, Washington, United States; 47.61575°N 122.321065°W

Wind Cradle is an outdoor 1976 stainless steel sculpture by Ali Baudoin, installed at the Seattle Central College campus in Seattle, Washington, in the United States.

== Description ==
Ali Baudoin's Wind Cradle is an abstract, allegorical sculpture ("winds") installed near the intersection of Broadway and Pine on the Seattle Central College campus. The stainless steel piece, which was "inspired by the winds that blow off Elliott Bay and up Pine Street past the college", measures 11 feet tall and 10 feet wide. It rests on a base that measures approximately 6 inches tall and 11 feet wide.

An inscription reads, "ALI BAUDOIN WIND CRADLE / STAINLESS STEEL 1976".

== History ==
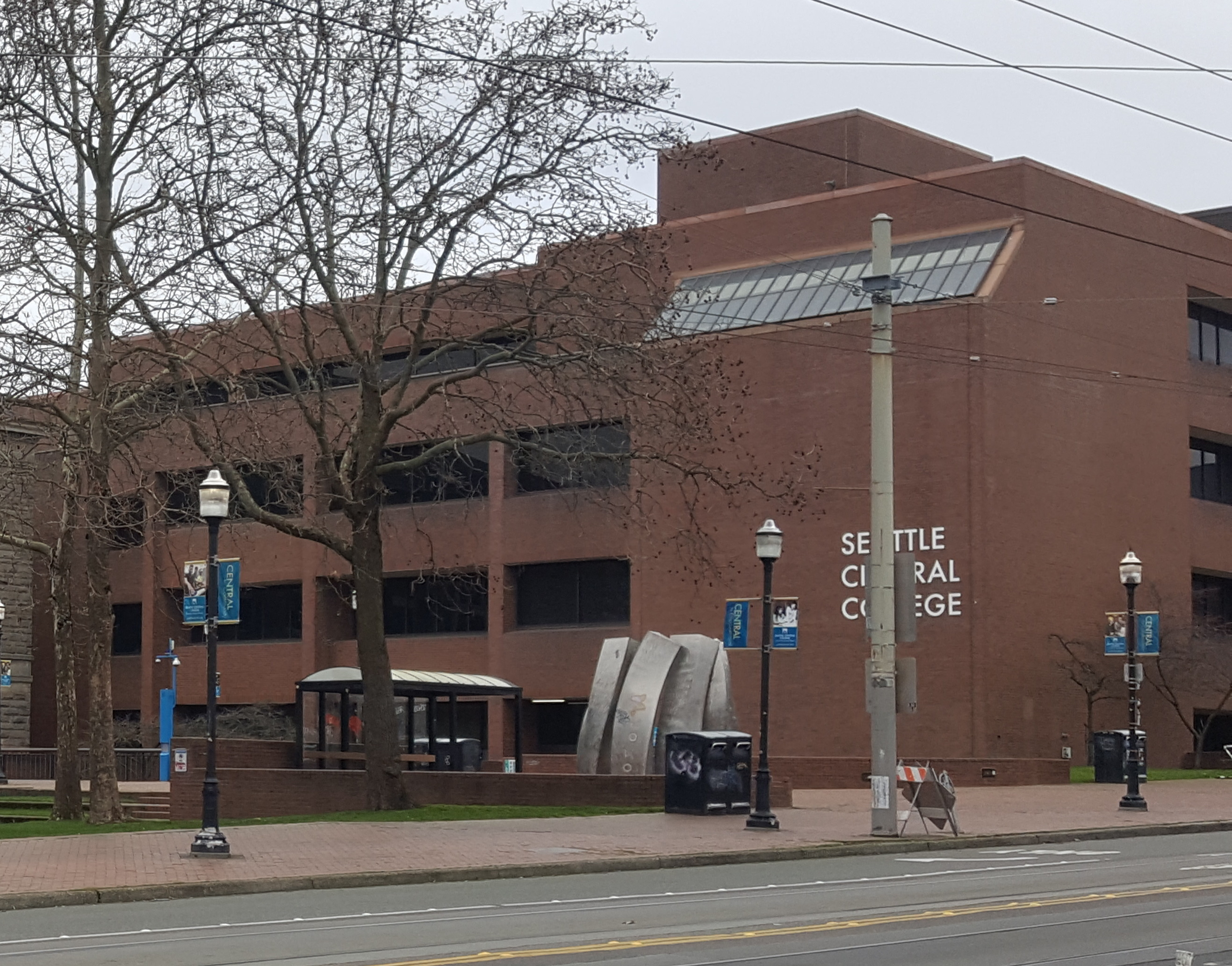
The sculpture at Seattle Central College, 2022

The artwork was surveyed and deemed "treatment needed" by the Smithsonian Institution's "Save Outdoor Sculpture!" program in 1994. It is administered by the Washington State Arts Commission's Art in Public Places Program.

== Reception ==
Seattle Weekly's David Stoesz said of the sculpture:

Wind Cradle looks like six giant blades of grass, or the magnified cartoon facial hairs of a razor commercial. The thrill of the piece is seeing something so small and delicate rendered as a monument in stainless steel. But indestructible as it looks, fashion has conspired against Wind Cradle. The work of New Mexico native and UW MFA grad Ali Baudoin, it was installed in 1976, when earnestly rendered organic forms in the Henry Moore tradition weren't exactly the latest thing. And it has a brushed steel surface of the kind that has since become emblematic of tacky condo facades. It's an unfortunate association for this lustrous, durable material that changes colors with the sky even after thirty years of being left out in the rain. Battleship gray when it's overcast, Wind Cradle is bluish silver on sunny afternoons. Scandalously overlooked by Brian Miller in his recent survey of local public art, it seems these days to serve mainly as a kiosk for stickers and fliers. Wind Cradle doesn't look like it cares about the neglect, or the mockery its dippy name might attract. Making little effort to assert itself against the open space, it continues in its impervious way to be pushed gently inward by some unseen force.

== See also ==
- 1976 in art
