= Seattle Center Totem =

1970 totem pole in Seattle, Washington, U.S.

- The totem pole in 2022
- Year: 1970
- Location: Seattle, Washington, U.S.
- 47°37′15″N 122°21′5″W

The Seattle Center Totem is a 1970 totem pole carved by Duane Pasco, Victor Mowatt, and Earl Muldon, installed at Seattle Center in the U.S. state of Washington. The 30-foot-tall totem depicts a hawk, a bear holding a salmon, a raven, and a killer whale. The work was funded by the Seattle Arts Commission.

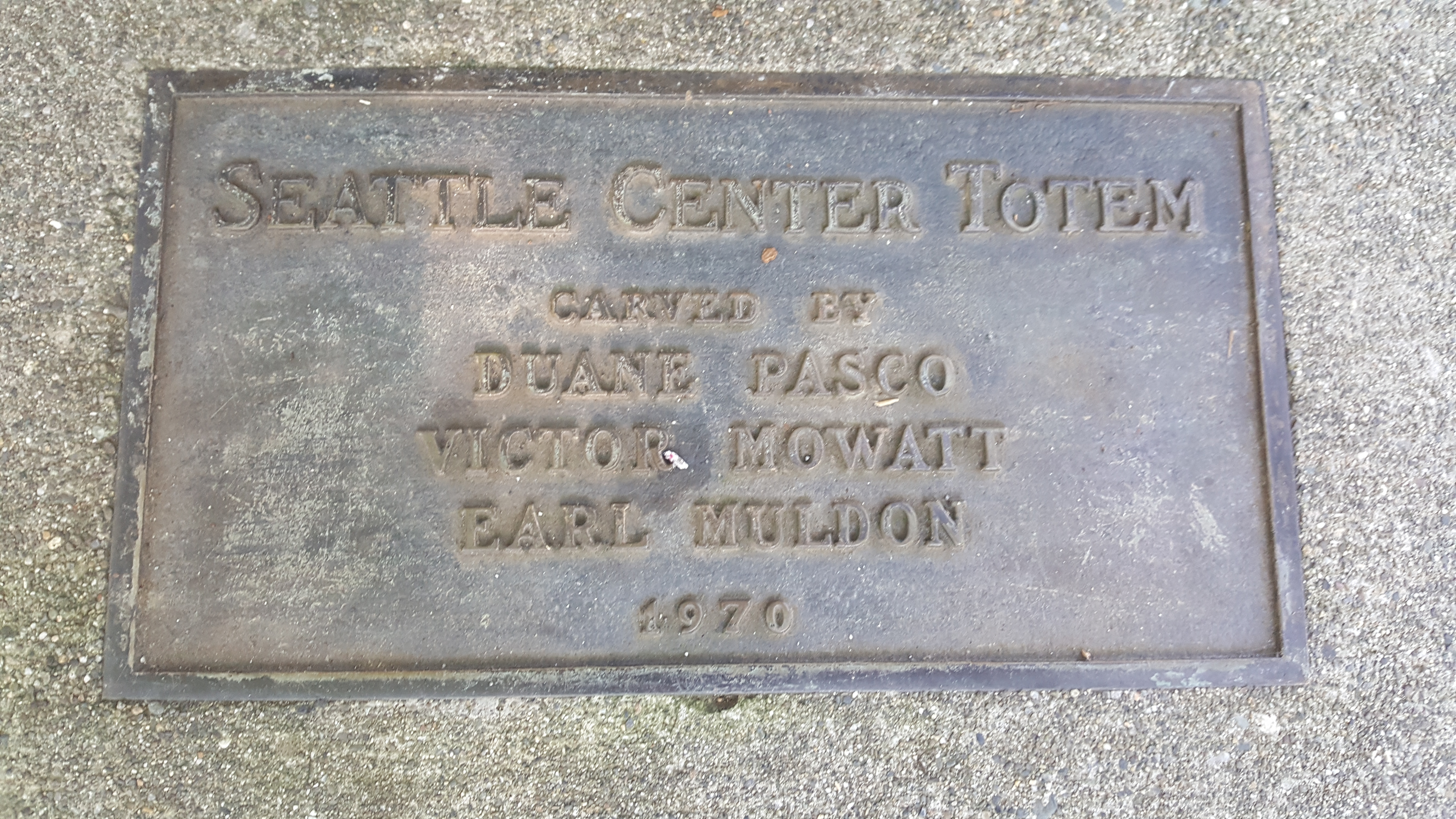
Plaque

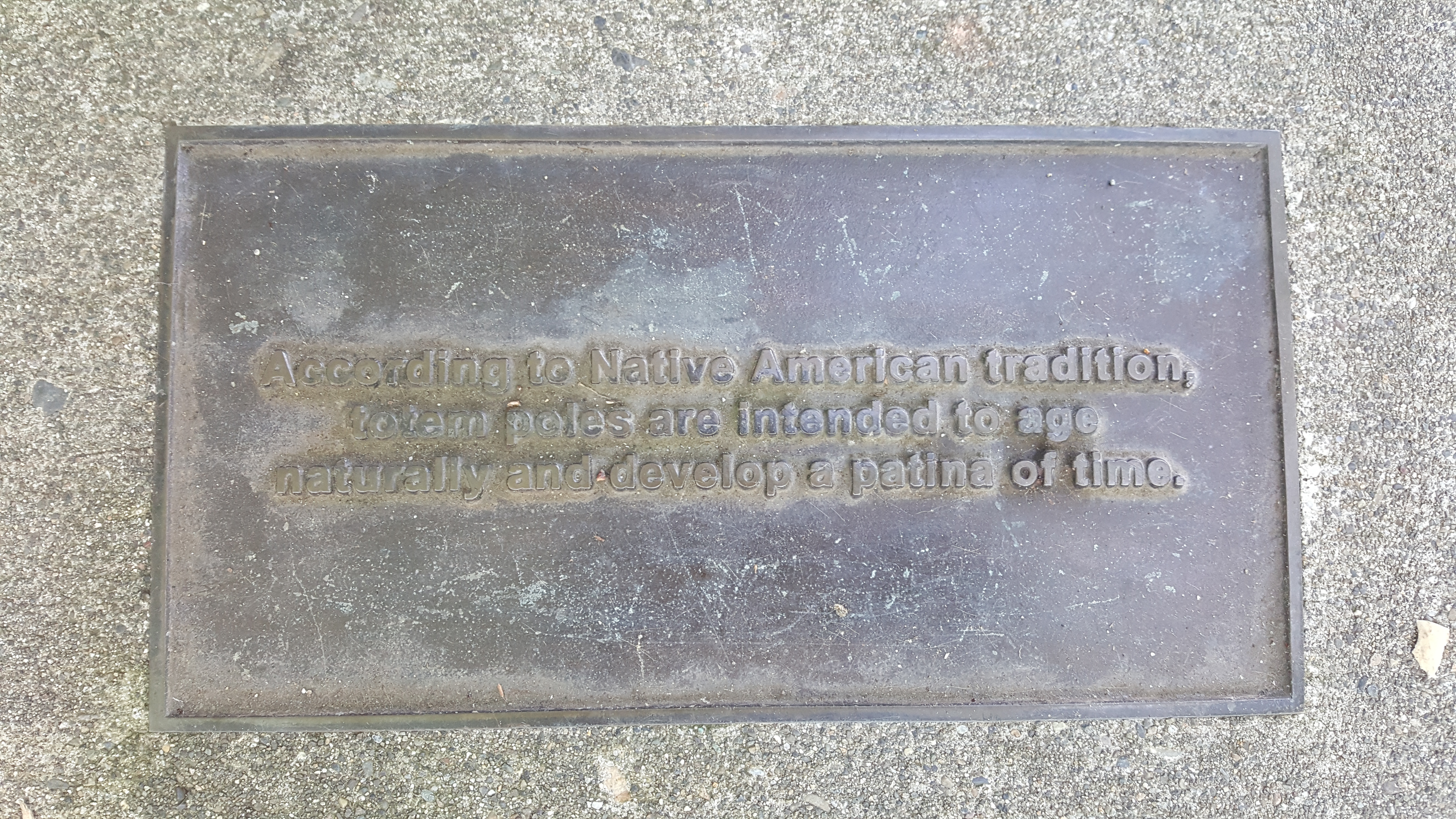
Plaque
