= Angie's Umbrella =

2003 sculpture in Seattle, Washington, U.S.

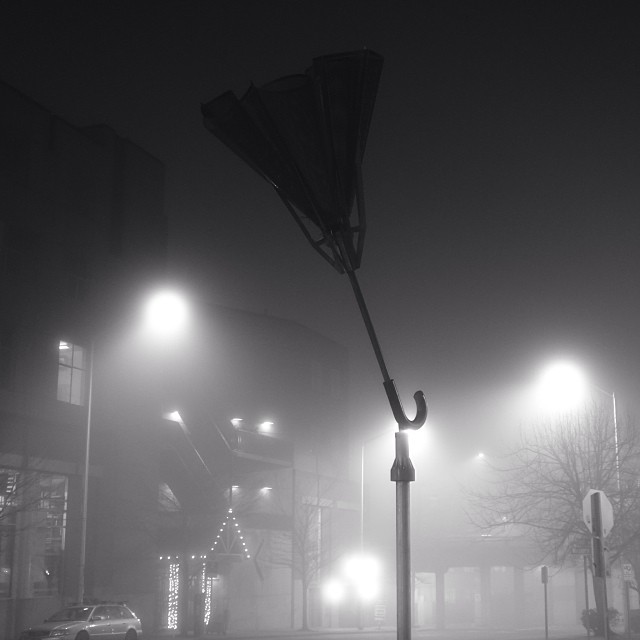
- The sculpture in 2013
- Artist: Jim Pridgeon; Benson Shaw
- Year: 2003
- Medium: Stainless steel; powder coated aluminum; cast urethane
- Dimensions: 9.1 m (30 ft); 14 m diameter (45 ft)
- Location: Seattle, Washington, U.S.; 47.6114°N 122.3452°W

Angie's Umbrella is a 30-foot (9.1 m) tall metal sculpture by Jim Pridgeon and Benson Shaw, installed in Seattle, Washington, United States.

== Description ==
The sculpture of an inside-out umbrella is installed at the intersection of Elliott and Western Avenues at Lenora Street. Named after Pridgeon's grandmother, the 2003 artwork is made of stainless steel, powder coated aluminum, and cast urethane. It is 30 feet (9.1 m) tall and has a diameter of 45 feet (14 m). Regina Hackett of the Seattle Post-Intelligencer described the artwork as "lean, clean and even elegant, with black trim and red mesh metal creating a moiré pattern". Inspired by Seattle's rainy weather, the red sculpture rotates 360 degrees, depending on which way the wind is blowing. An artist statement published by the City of Seattle says, "The basic idea was to complete an artwork that would successfully meet the inherent aesthetic need of the site, while simultaneously gaining community support and passing engineering and city administrative review."

== History ==
The artwork was commissioned by the Belltown and Denny Hill Business Associations, Belltown Community Council, and the Seattle Department of Neighborhoods' Early Implementation funds.

== Reception ==
The Seattle Post-Intelligencer's Regina Hackett said the artwork "puts a flashy punctuation point between the Market and Belltown" and complimented the artists, writing, "In other hands, an inside-out umbrella might have been corny or despicably cute." Writing for the Orlando Sentinel, John and Sally Macdonald said the work was "likely to become a beloved icon in soggy Seattle" in 2006. Angie's Umbrella has been included in multiple Curbed Seattle lists, including Kelly Skahan's 2011 overview of Seattle's "finest" public art, Sean Keeley's overview of the city's "most loathed" public art, and Keeley and Sarah Anne Lloyd's 2019 list of 30 "notable public art spots in Seattle". The sculpture has been included in a Frommer's walking tour of the city.
