= Statue of Christopher Columbus (Seattle) =

Statue formerly installed in Seattle, Washington, U.S.

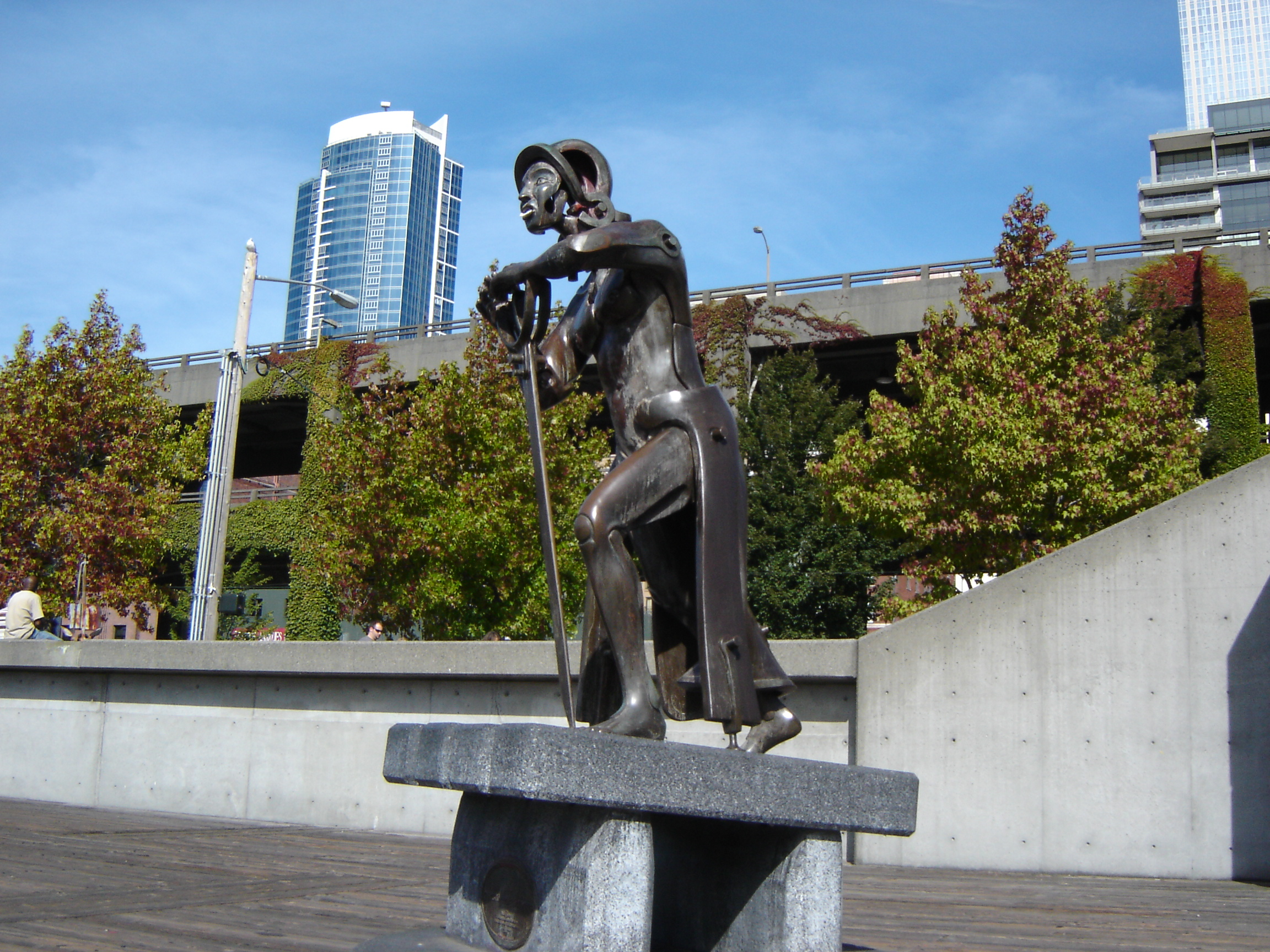
- The statue in 2009
- Subject: Christopher Columbus
- Location: Seattle, Washington, U.S.; 47.6067°N 122.3415°W

A statue of Christopher Columbus was installed in Seattle, in the U.S. state of Washington. Initially refused by the Seattle Arts Commission, the bronze sculpture was installed at Waterfront Park in 1978. Following much vandalism, the statue was removed and placed into storage in 2012.
