= Grass Blades =

Sculpture in Seattle, Washington, U.S.

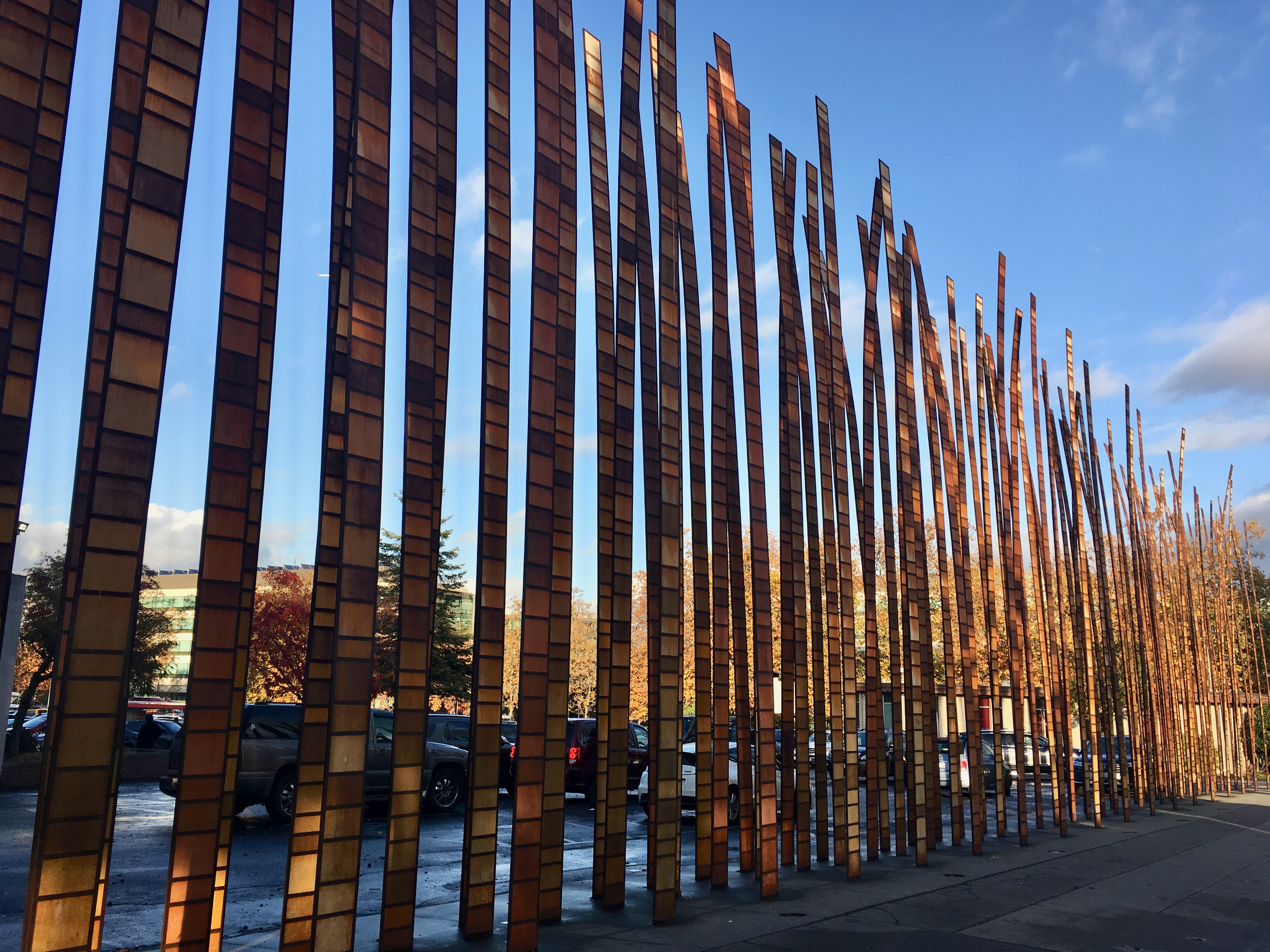
- The sculpture in 2019
- Year: 2002
- Location: Seattle, Washington, U.S.
- 47°37′19.8″N 122°20′54.6″W

Grass Blades is a 2002 sculpture by John Fleming, r/b/f architecture, and Susan Zoccola, installed in Seattle Center, in the U.S. state of Washington.

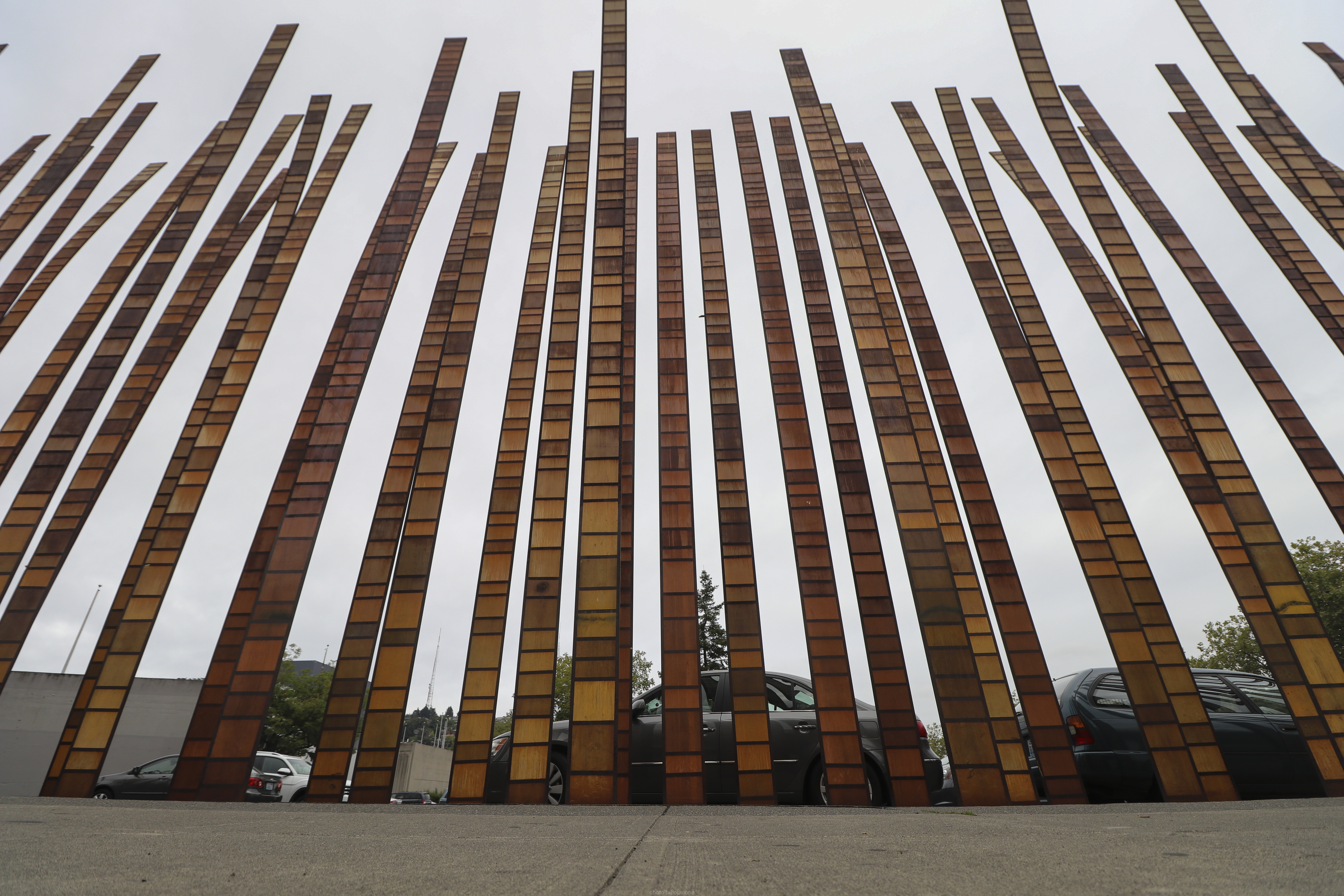

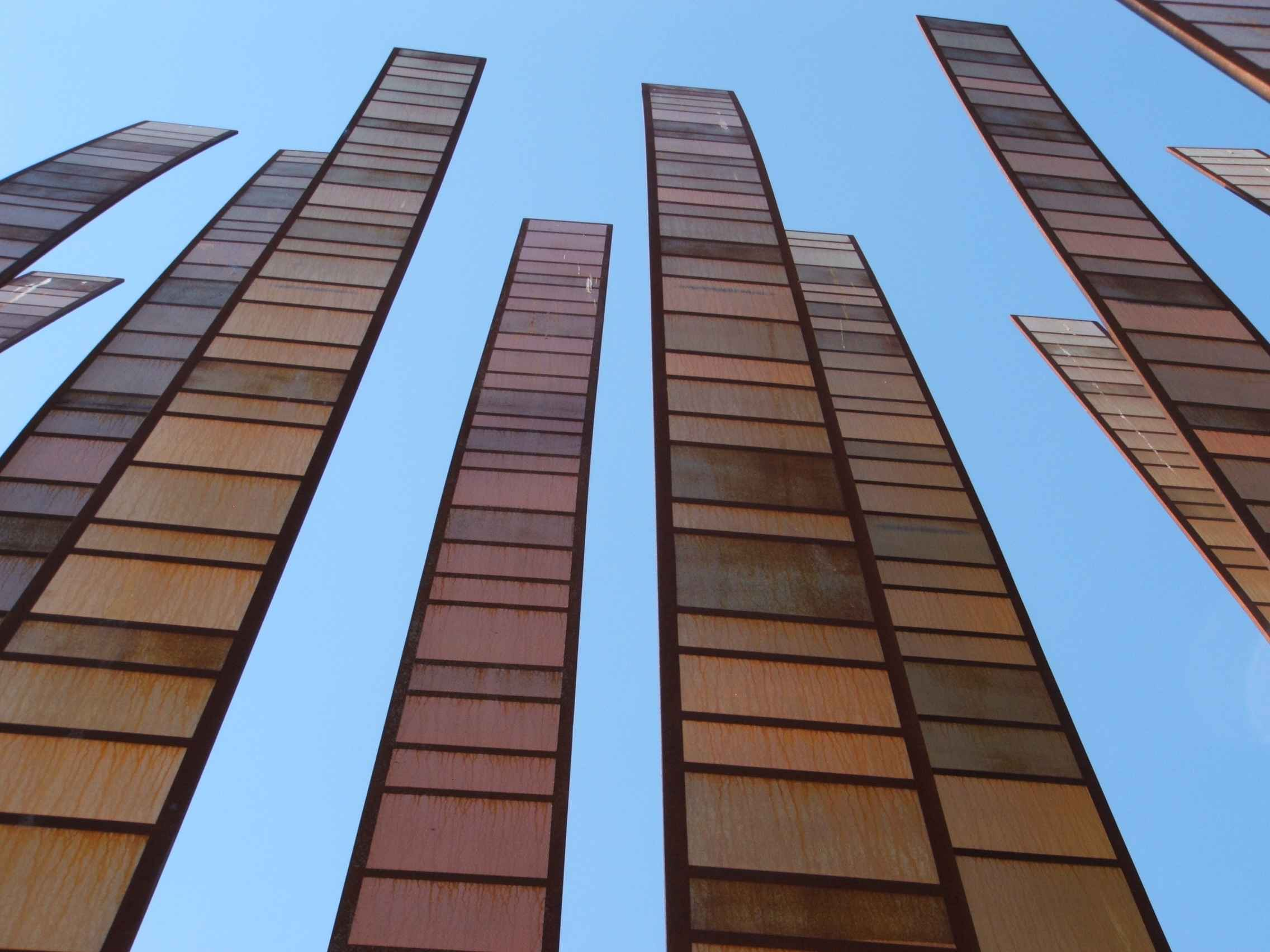
