= Bust of James J. Hill =

Sculpture in Seattle, Washington, U.S.

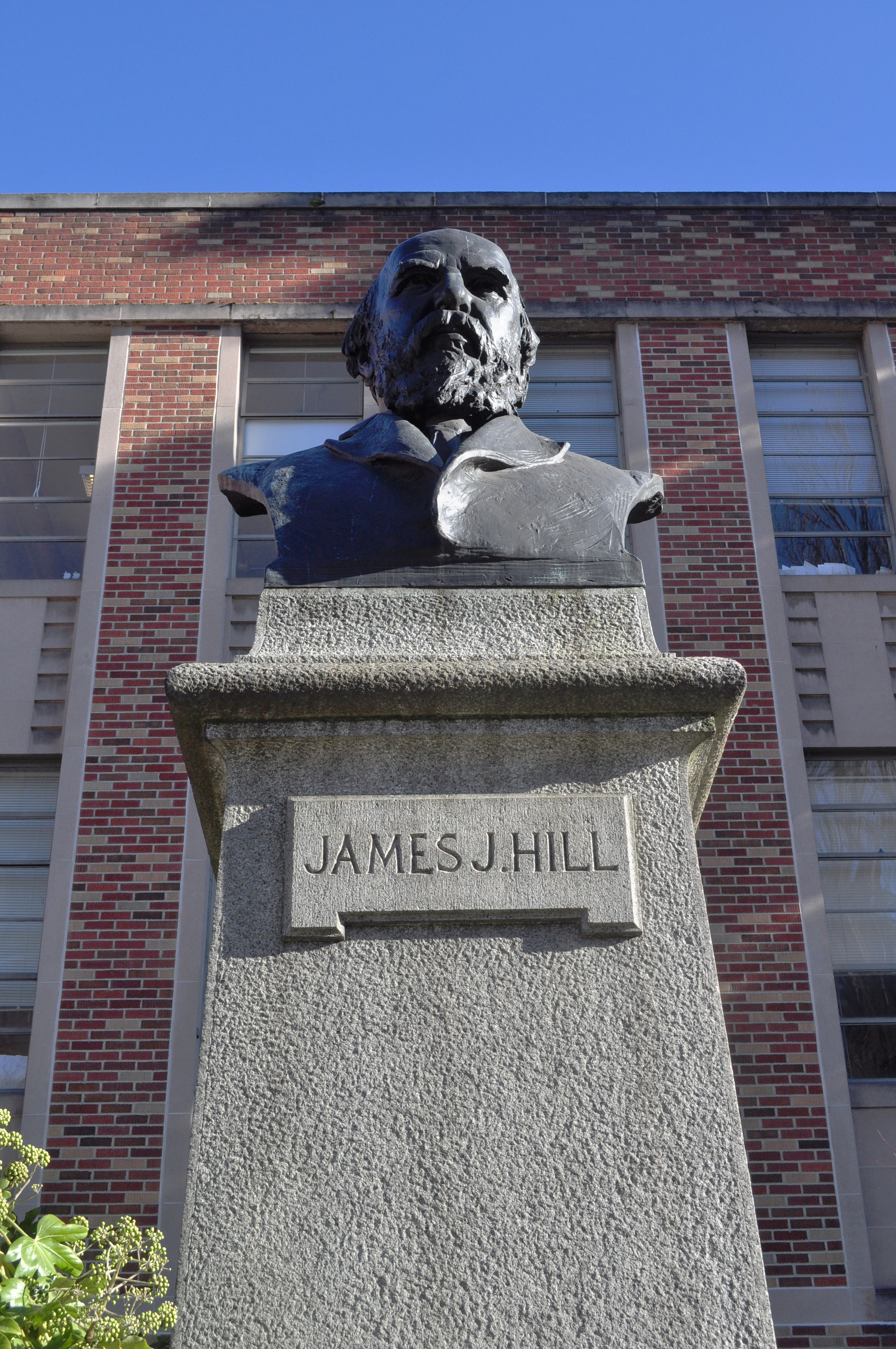
- The bust in 2019
- Subject: James J. Hill
- Location: Seattle, Washington, U.S.; 47°39′10.2″N 122°18′19.5″W

A bust of James J. Hill, called The Empire Builder, is installed on the University of Washington campus, in Seattle, Washington. The sculpture was created by Finn Haakon Frolich for the city's first world's fair in 1909.

It is located on Stevens Way at the northwest end of More Hall (civil and environmental engineering), where it has been located since its placement in 1953.

The bust statue is 6 feet (1.8m) tall, and was cast in bronze in New York. It is placed on a 12 foot (3.7m) pedestal made of granite, and was unveiled by former Minnesota governor John A. Johnson.
