= Straight Shot =

2007 public artwork in Seattle, Washington, U.S.

- "Linehenge"
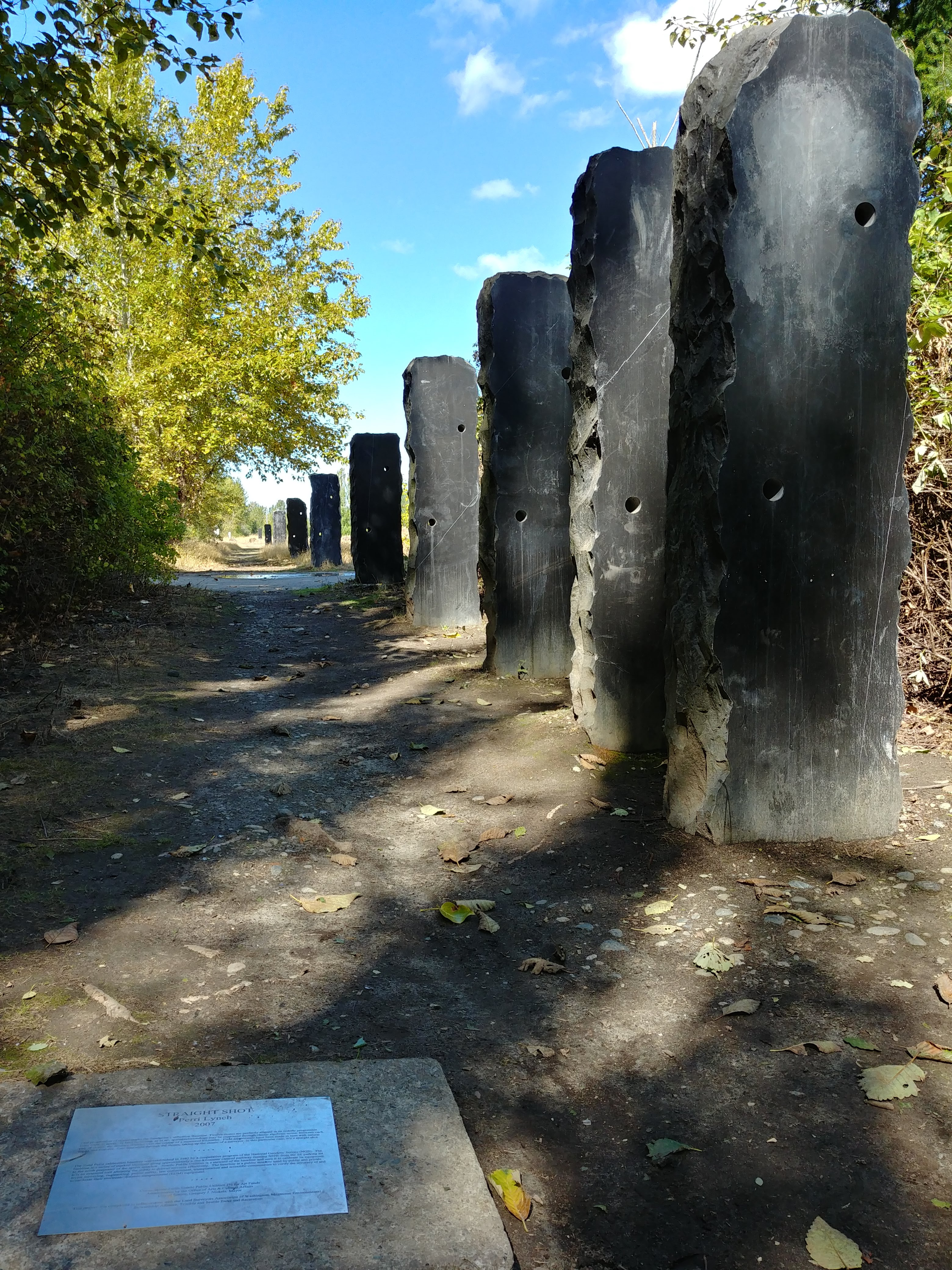
- Southern end of the installation, 2018
- Artist: Perri Lynch
- Year: 2007
- Medium: Limestone
- Subject: Surveying
- Dimensions: 1 m × 1000 m (3.3 ft × 3,300 ft)
- Location: Seattle, Washington, U.S.
- 47°40′26.20299″N 122°15′06.20661″W
- Website: sandpointbaseline.blogspot.com

Straight Shot is a 2007 public art work at the Sand Point calibration baseline in Magnuson Park, Seattle. It was created by Seattle artist Perri Lynch, and funded by the City of Seattle's 1% for Art program, Trimble and the Washington Surveyors Association. The baseline at Sand Point predates the development of Magnuson Park, and was originally at the western edge of the Navy's Naval Air Station Seattle runway at the location. The artwork was created in part to illustrate the importance of the baseline to surveyors and to preserve the baseline – "in peril of being destroyed" – as a part of the park. The work has been nicknamed "Linehenge" by surveyors.

== Physical description ==
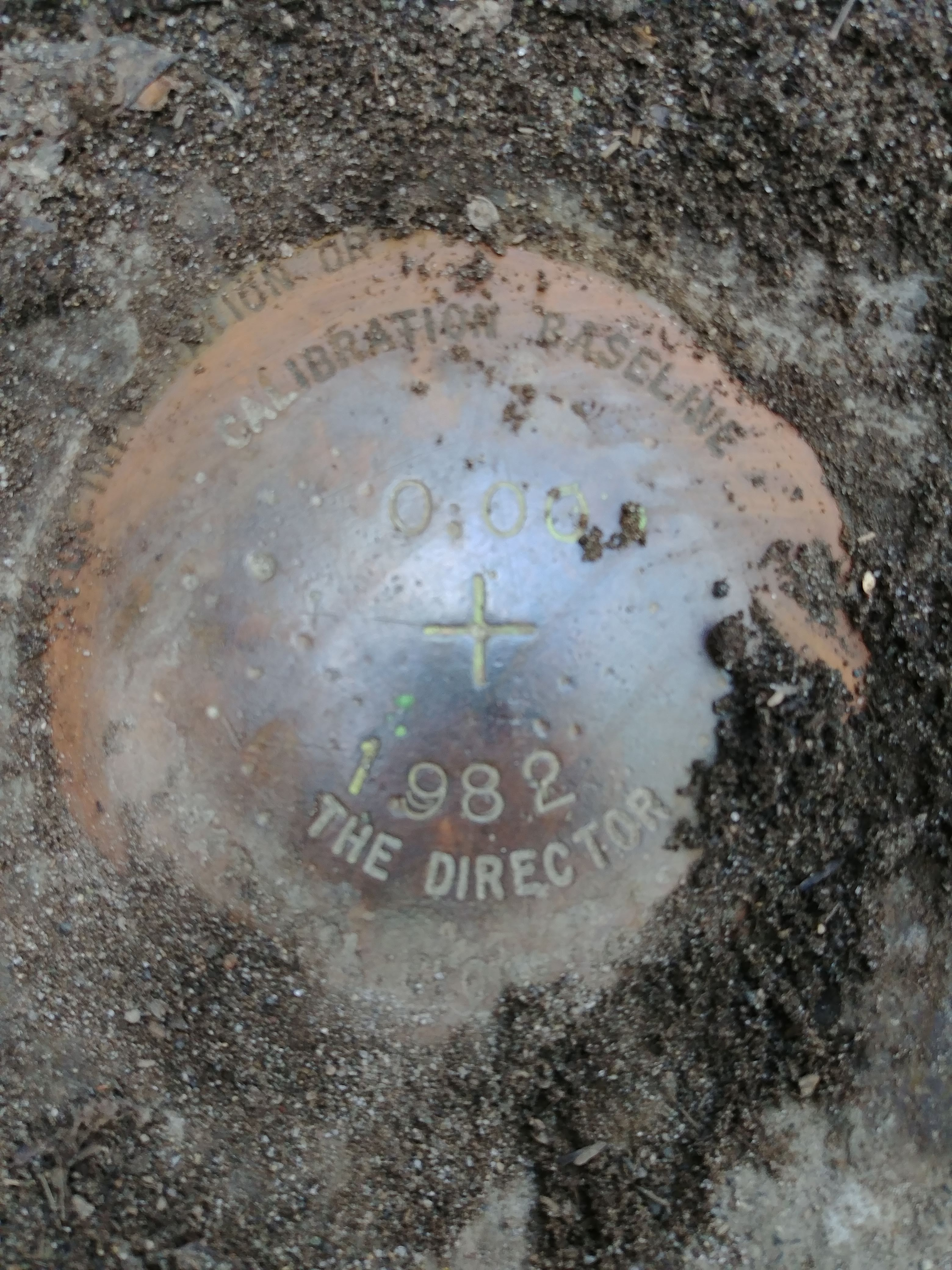
Geodetic mark at the beginning of the baseline

The piece consists of twelve dark limestone obelisks with cylindrical boreholes aligned with one another, adjacent to and following the path of the 1-kilometer baseline starting at the Lake Washington shoreline at 47°40′26.20299″N 122°15′06.20661″W, and ending at the park's northern edge 47°40′59.73768″N 122°15′16.62911″W.

== Artist ==
Perri Lynch went to Marblehead High School in Massachusetts, and has undergraduate degrees from The Evergreen State College in Olympia and the University of Washington in Seattle, and a 2001 Master of Fine Arts from Cranbrook Academy of Art in Michigan. She was a 2009 Fulbright Scholar.
