= Dancer with Flat Hat =

Sculpture in Seattle, Washington, U.S.

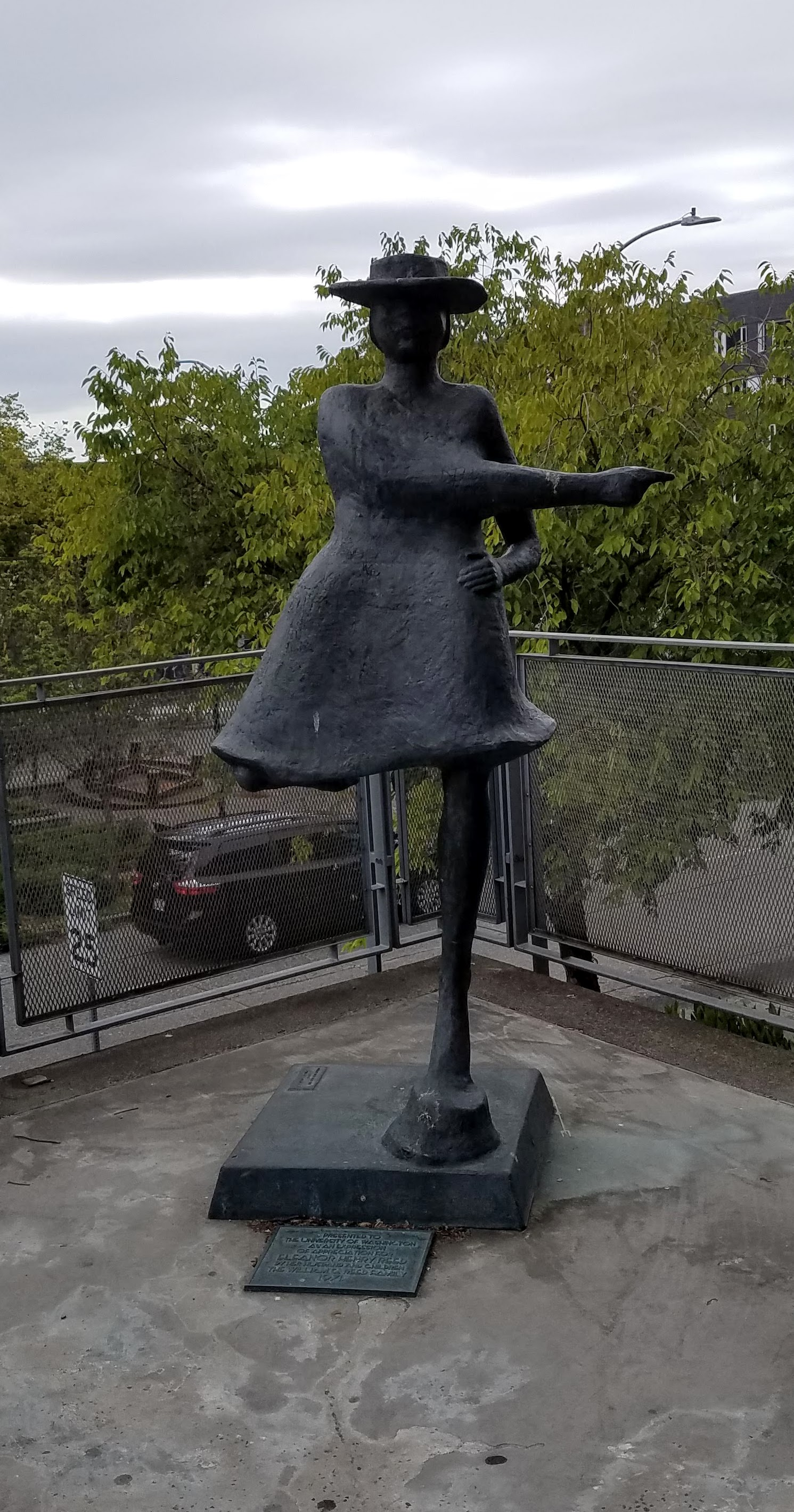
- The sculpture in 2021
- Artist: Phillip Levine
- Year: 1966
- Medium: Silicon bronze
- Subject: A female wearing a flat hat and skirt
- Dimensions: (10 7/8 in × 4 7/8 in × 3 3/8 in)
- Location: Seattle Art Museum
- 47°39′22.8″N 122°18′44.6″W

Dancer with Flat Hat is a sculpture by Phillip Levine.

== Description and history ==
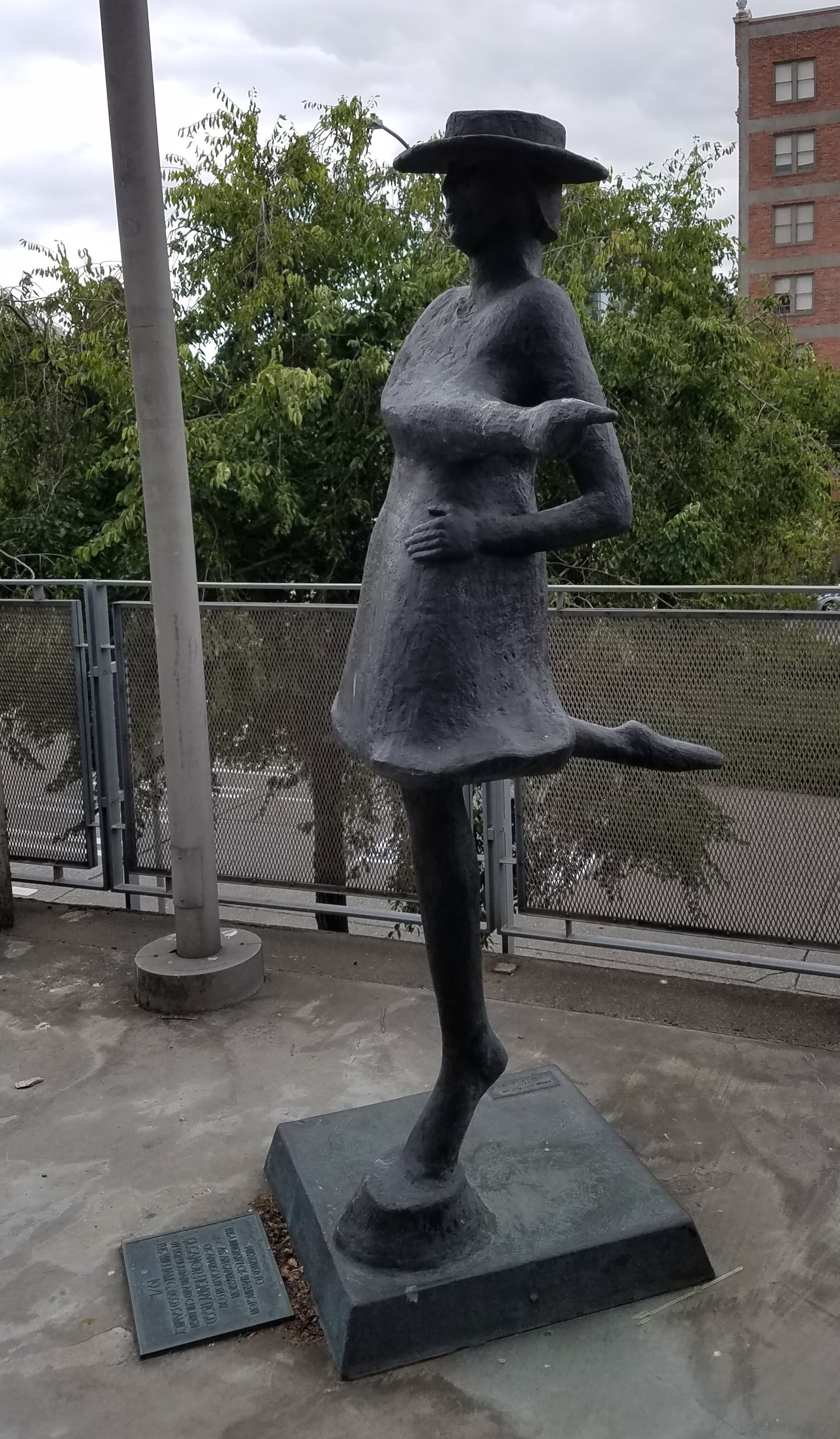
The sculpture in 2021

There may be multiple copies, since sources give conflicting information. The Smithsonian Institution describes a 1966 silicon bronze, cire perdue casting that measures approximately 10 7/8 x 4 7/8 x 3 3/8 in. The sculpture is part of the Seattle Art Museum's collection (or was at the time of the survey).

Other sources describe a 1971 full-length abstract bronze statue, also known as Girl with Flat Hat and Pointing Dancing Woman, installed at the 15th Avenue pedestrian bridge by Schmitz Hall on the University of Washington campus in Seattle, Washington's University District. According to the Smithsonian Institution, which surveyed the work and deemed it "treatment needed" as part of its "Save Outdoor Sculpture!" program in June 1994, the sculpture was donated to the university in 1971 by the William G. Reed family in honor of Eleanor Henry Reed. It depicts a female wearing a flat hat and skirt; she stands on her proper left tiptoe and her opposite leg is lifted and bent behind her. She points westward with her proper right arm. The sculpture measures 6.5 feet (2.0 m) tall and 18 inches (0.46 m) wide and rests on a bronze base that measures approximately 5 inches (0.13 m) x 2 feet (0.61 m) x 2 feet (0.61 m). In 1989, when Levine discovered that the leg was broken as the result of vandalism, he asked to repair the piece at his home. It is administered by the University of Washington's Public Art Administration.

== Reception ==
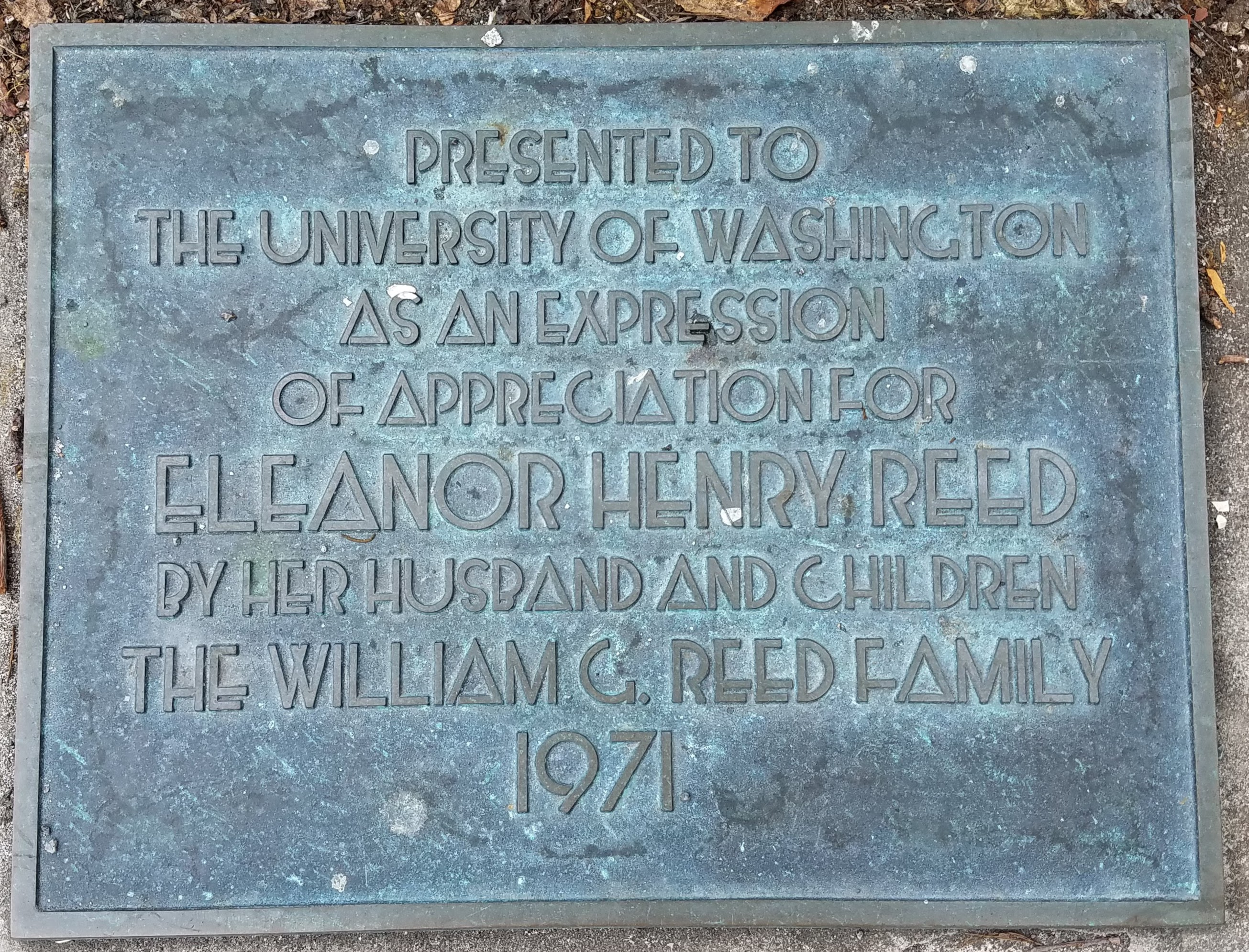
Plaque

According to the Smithsonian Institution, the 1971 statue is often decorated by students, "with flower garlands, a muffler added around her neck, and shoes laced over her feet". Seattle Weekly said the sculpture "manages to look spontaneous and settled at the same time; her pirouette is forever frozen amid the collegiate bustle. The piece is anchored in motion, like other sculptures and drawings". It has been included in at least one published walking tour of Seattle.
