= Statue of Sun Yat-sen (Seattle) =

Statue in Seattle, Washington, U.S.

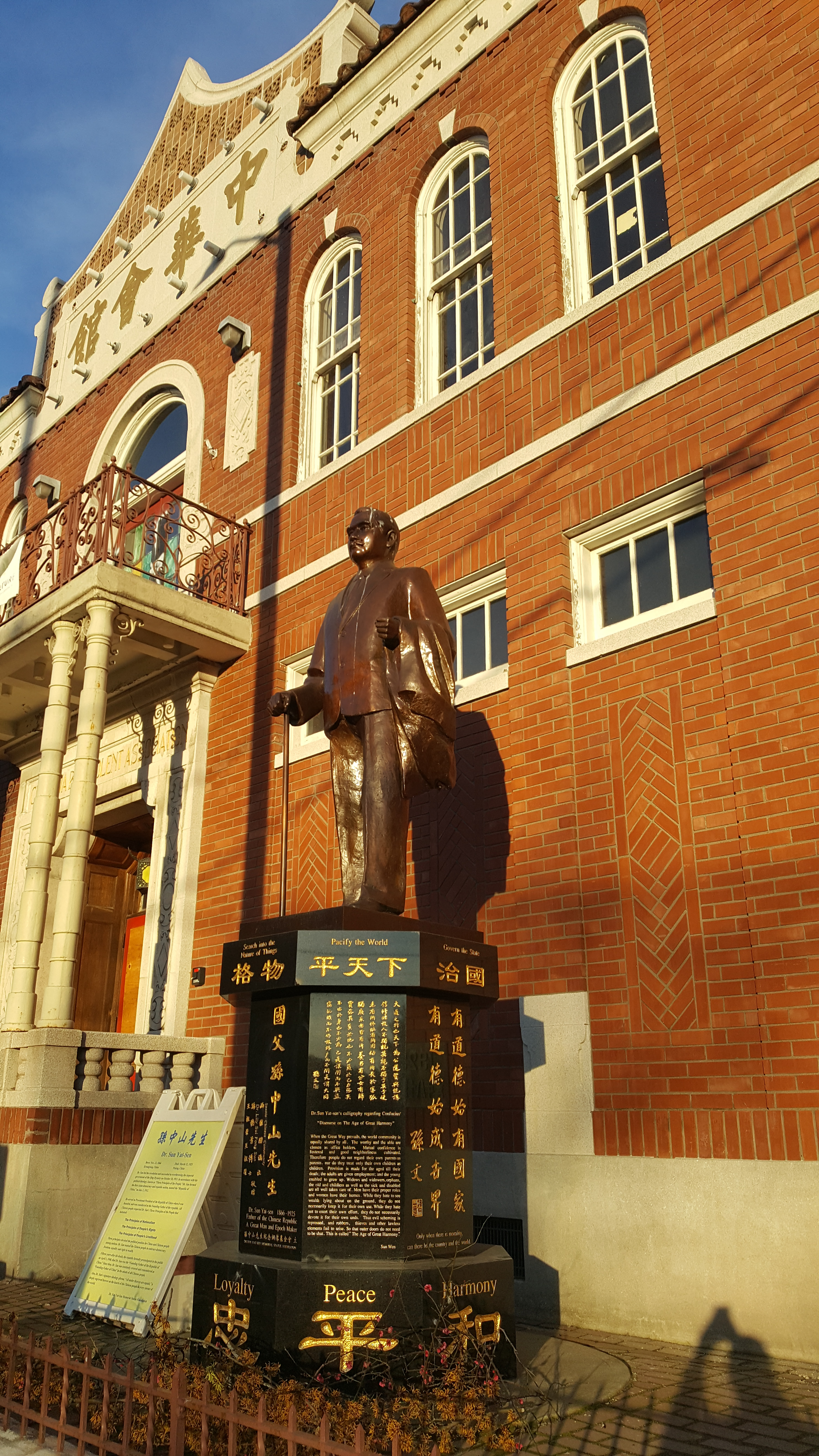
- The statue in 2022
- Subject: Sun Yat-sen
- Location: Seattle, Washington, U.S.; 47°35′52″N 122°19′25″W

A statue of Sun Yat-sen was installed in Seattle, in the U.S. state of Washington, in 2018. It is located in front of the Chong Wa Benevolent Association.
