= Black Lightning (sculpture) =

Artwork by Ronald Bladen in Seattle, Washington, U.S.

- The sculpture in December 2022
- Artist: Ronald Bladen
- Year: 1981
- Location: Seattle, Washington, U.S.
- 47°37′14″N 122°20′54″W

Black Lightning is a 1981 stainless steel sculpture by Ronald Bladen, installed at Seattle Center, in the U.S. state of Washington.
