= Walter Nicks =

Walter Nicks (July 26, 1925 – April 3, 2007) was an African-American modern dancer, choreographer, and teacher of jazz and modern dance. He was a certified master teacher of Katherine Dunham technique. He was professionally active for nearly 60 years.

== Biography ==
Nicks was born in Pittsburgh, Pennsylvania, and was raised in Cleveland, Ohio, where he graduated from Central High School. From 1942 to 1944 he attended Howard University. His early dance training took place at Cleveland's Karamu Settlement House.

He studied dance at the Katherine Dunham School in New York (1945), whose teachers included Dunham, Lavinia Williams, Talley Beatty, Tommy Gomez, Archie Savage and Marie Bryant. He also studied with José Limón, Robert Joffrey, Karel Shook, Louis Horst and Doris Humphrey.

Dunham awarded him (1947) a fellowship to study for a Master Teaching Certificate in Dunham Technique, which he received in 1948.

In 1947 Nicks was appointed Assistant Director of Dance at the Dunham School, a position which he held until 1953.

In 1948-49 he danced in the Benny Goodman Jazz Review on a 13-month tour.

Nicks left the Dunham School in 1953. Forming a small company, "El Ballet Negro de Walter Nicks," in Mexico, he performed at the Insurgentes Theatre in Mexico City in a production starring Cantinflas; at the Sans Souci in Havana; on television in the Dominican Republic, and at the Condado Beach Hotel in San Juan. Also during this period, he spent five months in Haiti observing Vodou dances.

Upon his return to New York, he became an instructor with the Phillips-Fort Studio (1954–55). In 1954 he performed with Joe Nash and others in Donald McKayle's "Games" at the 92nd Street Y.

Nicks died 3 April 2007 in Brooklyn, New York.

== Achievements ==
Nicks is noted for:

- Dancer in My Darlin' Aida, 1952
- Dancer and Assistant Choreographer for House of Flowers in Philadelphia and on Broadway (working under choreographers George Balanchine and Herbert Ross), 1954–55. He coached Arthur Mitchell, Geoffrey Holder, Carmen De Lavallade, Dolores Harper, Louis Johnson, Donald McKayle, Albert Popwell and Glory Van Scott and others.
- Assistant Choreographer for Jamaica under Jack Cole, working with Alvin Ailey and Christyne Lawson, 1957–59
- Assistant Choreographer for Carmen Jones under Oona White at City Center Theatre
- John Hay Whitney Fellowship to study cultural dances in Brazil (1956–1957)
- Choreorographer for Harry Belafonte (1959–1963); he choreographed Belafonte specials on CBS-TV: "Tonight with Belafonte" (1959) which won Belafonte an Emmy, "New York 19" (1960), "Look Up and Live." and several Belafonte stage productions that toured the country, including "Sing, Man, Sing" (1956), with dancers Alvin Ailey and Mary Hinkson, and "Belafonte '63".

Nicks introduced jazz dance instruction to Europe at the International Academy of Dance in Krefeld, Germany (1959).

In Sweden, under the auspices of Lia Schubert, Nicks became a consultant at the Stockholm University (1960–67), a guest instructor at the Swedish Ballet Academy (1960), and performed there with his small company (1961–65). He appeared several times on Swedish television in the 1960s; of particular importance was the series "Introduction to Jazz Ballet" with Schubert (1966). He was professor and Director of Jazz Dance at Stockholm's Statens Dansskola (1967–1971). He choreographed the Swedish production of West Side Story (1968). He danced in a 1969 concert of Duke Ellington's sacred music with the Duke Ellington Orchestra at Gustaf Vasa Church in Stockholm, which was broadcast on Swedish television.

As a consultant to the government of Guinea in 1963, Nicks studied traditional dances and formulated recommendations which resulted in the formation of Le Ballet National Djoliba by President Sékou Touré.

In the Summer of 1972, at the request of the French Federation of Dance, Nicks founded the Walter Nicks Dance Theatre Workshop. Under the auspices of the Federation, the company toured France and Belgium, and later performed in the French Caribbean.

Nicks taught at international dance workshops and festivals in Germany, France, Israel, Spain, Italy, Finland, and East Berlin.

For several years he taught at the Folkwang Hochschule in Essen-Werden, Germany.

Meanwhile, Nicks continued to be professionally active in the United States. The Walter Nicks Dance Theatre Workshop was affiliated with the Connecticut College American Dance Festival for several years beginning in 1973. It was community oriented, and concert performances were accompanied by workshops, lecture demonstrations and dance instruction.

The Nicks company participated in the National Endowment for the Arts's "Artists-in-the-Schools" program for nine years (1973–1981).

Nicks was co-founder and Artistic Director of Centre Formation Professionelle in Poitiers, France (1982–1992).

He choreographed "Spirit Blues" for the National Ballet of Finland, which premiered on 19 October 1989 at the Finnish National Opera.

The Walter Nicks Dance Theatre Workshop was based since its inception at the Church of the Intercession in Manhattan, where Nicks performed with his dancers in the Palm Sunday pageant through 2002.

Nicks was a faculty member/resident artist at Connecticut College (American Dance Festival), University of Maryland, Bard College, Duke University (1991), and the University of Nevada, Las Vegas (1992–94).

== Recent work ==
- Choreographed "Trance Atlantic" for Philadanco (2000)
- Taught at Howard University
- Taught and performed at the Katherine Dunham celebration at Jacobs Pillow in 2002
- Served on the faculty of the New York City Board of Education's Dance Institute (Summer, 2002)

Nicks was on the Executive Committee of the International Association of Blacks in Dance, and on the Advisory Board of the Black Arts Network Diaspora. He was a recipient of The Balasaraswati/Joy Ann Dewey Beinecke Endowed Chair for Distinguished Teaching from the American Dance Festival.
