= Katherine Dunham Technique =

Dance technique developed by Katherine Dunham

- Genre: Modern dance, Afro-Caribbean dance
- Inventor: Katherine Dunham
- Year: 1940s
- Origin: United States

Katherine Dunham Technique is a modern dance technique developed by Katherine Dunham, an African American dancer, choreographer, and anthropologist. It is a fusion of Afro-Caribbean dance, ballet, and modern dance, known for its emphasis on body isolations, polyrhythmic movement, and an integration of cultural and spiritual elements. The technique has been widely influential in dance training, particularly in modern and jazz dance disciplines, and continues to be taught in dance institutions worldwide.

== History ==
In the 1930s and 1940s, Katherine Dunham conducted anthropological research in the Caribbean, studying the traditional dances of Haiti, Jamaica, Martinique, and Trinidad. Her fieldwork provided the foundation for what would become the Dunham Technique, blending the rhythmic and dynamic qualities of Caribbean and African movement with the structural discipline of ballet and modern dance. Dunham formally introduced her technique in the 1940s while choreographing for the Katherine Dunham Company, one of the first major African American modern dance companies. In 1945, she established the Katherine Dunham School of Dance in New York City, which became a hub for training professional dancers and choreographers. The technique quickly gained recognition, influencing performers in Broadway, Hollywood, and concert dance. dance

== Core Principles ==
The Dunham Technique is built on several key principles, emphasizing a holistic approach to movement that integrates cultural awareness, physical strength, and expressive storytelling.

- Body isolation – The ability to move different parts of the body independently, a characteristic central to African and Caribbean dance traditions.
- Polyrhythms – Executing multiple rhythmic patterns simultaneously, challenging dancers to maintain precise timing and coordination.
- Flexibility and strength – Developing a strong and agile body to execute dynamic movements with control and grace.
- Spiritual and cultural connection – Encouraging dancers to engage with the historical and cultural narratives embedded in the movement.
- Dynamic use of the spine – Incorporating fluid spinal movements, undulations, and contractions that express emotional and physical depth.
- Grounded movement – Emphasizing a strong connection to the earth, contrasting with the lifted quality of ballet.

== Training Exercises ==
The Dunham Technique consists of a structured training regimen designed to develop strength, rhythm, and expressive movement. Some of the core exercises include:

- Barre work – Adapted from ballet, Dunham's barre exercises develop flexibility, alignment, and core strength while integrating isolations and Afro-Caribbean movement.
- Isolations – Practicing precise control over different body parts, such as moving the head, shoulders, ribs, or hips independently from the rest of the body.
- Footwork drills – Combining percussive steps, syncopated rhythms, and grounded foot patterns influenced by African and Caribbean dances.
- Center floor exercises – Incorporating contractions, spinal undulations, and weighted movements to prepare the body for full-bodied expression.
- Progressions across the floor – Moving sequences that emphasize dynamic traveling, quick directional changes, and fluid transitions between levels.

== Influence and Legacy ==
The Dunham Technique has had a profound impact on the evolution of modern dance, jazz dance, and theatrical performance. Many renowned dancers and choreographers trained in Dunham's method, incorporating her principles into their own artistic practices.

=== Notable Dancers and Choreographers ===
Several influential figures in the dance world have studied or been influenced by the Dunham Technique:

- Alvin Ailey – Founder of Alvin Ailey American Dance Theater, who incorporated Dunham's techniques into his own choreographic style.
- Twyla Tharp – American choreographer known for blending modern dance with ballet and jazz influences.
- Donald McKayle – Pioneering African American modern dance choreographer who utilized elements of Dunham's approach.
- Arthur Mitchell – Founder of Dance Theatre of Harlem, who studied under Dunham and integrated her teachings into his ballet-based work.
- Debbie Allen – Actress, choreographer, and director known for incorporating Dunham's movement style into her work in film, television, and theater.
- Joan Peters (dancer) She was one of the few officially recognized master teachers of Dunham's method
- Pearl Reynolds She is associated with the Dunham Technique and worked as an instructor at the Alvin Ailey American Dance Theater and the Dance Theatre of Harlem.

=== Educational and Institutional Impact ===
Dunham's technique remains an essential component of dance education. It is taught at universities, conservatories, and professional training programs worldwide, including:

- University of California, Los Angeles (UCLA)
- Howard University
- Dance Theatre of Harlem
- Katherine Dance Certification

The Katherine Dunham Centers for Arts and Humanities continues to preserve and promote her legacy through educational programs and archival projects.

== See also ==
- Katherine Dunham
- Modern dance
