= Carib Song =

1945 musical

Carib Song is a 1945 Broadway musical with book and lyrics by William Archibald and music by Baldwin Bergersen. It opened at the Adelphi Theatre on September 27, 1945, and closed on October 27 after 36 performances. It was billed as "A Musical Play of the West Indies in Two Acts and Thirteen Scenes". The show focuses heavily on "Trinidadian folklore, ritual, and ethnographic dance".

== Premise ==
Setting: An unnamed island in the West Indies

During Carnival, an unfaithful woman has an affair with a village fisherman. She becomes pregnant, leading to gossip; eventually she is cast out of her community and murdered by her husband. The first act ended with a "stylized interpretation" of a Shango ritual.

== Production ==
Katherine Dunham, in addition to playing The Woman, served as the show's choreographer and a co-director. George Stanton produced, and Jo Mielziner provided lighting and scenic design. The show's company included Eartha Kitt.

Prior to its opening on Broadway, the show played at the Shubert Theater in Boston, starting September 4, 1945.

== Cast ==
	1945 Broadway
Leader of the Shango Dancers	Vanoye Aikens
The Fishwoman	Elsie Benjamin
The Woman	Katherine Dunham
The Fat Woman	Mable Sanford Lewis
The Fisherman	Avon Long
The Shango Priest	La Rosa Estrada
The Husband	William Franklin
The Tall Woman	Mercedes Gilbert
The Boy Possessed by a Snake	Tommy Gomez
The Singer	Harriet Jackson

== Influence ==
Several of the show's dance pieces were adapted into the repertoire of the Katherine Dunham Company.

== Reception ==
The New York World-Telegram gave the show a positive review, as did the New York Daily News. The New York Herald Tribune criticized the show's focus on dance, saying it "should have been billed as a dance recital". Meanwhile, a writer for Billboard said that Dunham danced too little in the show, and that dancing would have had more emotional impact than some of her dialogue; however, she agreed that "Carib Song...isn't a musical play. It's more of a lavish tropical revue". Others criticized the show for its length and its book, but in general the show's score, scenic design, and dancing were praised, with Long's performance specifically being called out by multiple reviewers.

Criticism of the show also intersected with racial biases and politics: some white critics felt there was dissonance between the serious story and the perceived lightheartedness of the Caribbean, while some Black critics felt the show presented black people as primitive.
