= Pearl Reynolds =

- Occupations: Dancer, choreographer, educator
- Organizations: Association of Black Choreographers, Alvin Ailey American Dance Theater, Dance Theatre of Harlem
- Known for: Contributions to African-American dance and choreography
- Notable work: House of Flowers, Jamaica, Kicks and Co., Blues for Mister Charlie

Pearl Reynolds was an American dancer, choreographer, and educator who made contributions to African-American dance and collaborated with prominent dance institutions. She performed on Broadway, appeared in films, and mentored dancers. She died on August 23, 2009.

== Early life and education ==
Details about Pearl Reynolds' early life and education are limited.

== Career ==
Reynolds had an extensive career in dance, spanning Broadway, film, and education.

=== Broadway performances ===
She appeared in several Broadway productions, including:

- House of Flowers (1954) – Mamselle Ibo-Lele
- Mister Johnson (1956) – Ensemble
- Jamaica (1957) – Islander
- Kicks and Co. (1961) – Ensemble
- Blues for Mister Charlie (1964) – Townsperson

=== Film appearances ===
Reynolds also appeared in the following films:

- Quest (1961)
- Syvilla: They Dance to Her Drum (1979)

=== Teaching and mentorship ===
Reynolds was associated with the Katherine Dunham Technique and worked as an instructor at the Alvin Ailey American Dance Theater and the Dance Theatre of Harlem.

In 1985 and 1986, Reynolds conducted workshops at Houston Community College, contributing to the development of the African Dance Society there.

=== Association of Black Choreographers ===
Reynolds co-founded the Association of Black Choreographers alongside Carole Johnson, Rod Rodgers, Gus Solomons Jr., and Eleo Pomare. This organization preceded the Modern Organization for Dance Evolvement (MODE) and focused on promoting Black choreographers.

== Legacy ==
Pearl Reynolds influenced numerous dancers and choreographers. Kariamu Welsh, founder of the Umfundalai technique, acknowledged Reynolds as a mentor and friend.

Additionally, Dr. Sherrill Berryman Johnson, a choreographer and educator, studied under Reynolds and Katherine Dunham, highlighting Reynolds' role in nurturing future leaders in the dance community.

== See also ==
Digital Collections (NYPL) - Pearl Reynolds
