= House of Flowers =

House of Flowers may refer to:

- House of Flowers (mausoleum)
- House of Flowers (musical), a 1954 Broadway musical
- The House of Flowers (TV series), a 2018 Mexican Netflix series
- Casa de las Flores or House of Flowers, an historic monument in Chamberí, Madrid
- "House of Flowers" (short story), by Truman Capote
