= Life Begins at 8:40 =

- Music: Harold Arlen
- Lyrics: Ira Gershwin; E.Y. Harburg
- Productions: 1934 Broadway

Life Begins at 8:40 is a musical revue with music by Harold Arlen, lyrics by Ira Gershwin and E.Y. Harburg, and sketches by Gershwin, Harburg, David Freedman, H.I. Phillips, Alan Baxter, Henry Clapp Smith, and Frank Gabrielson.

When Harburg and Vernon Duke parted ways after clashing over Ziegfeld Follies of 1934, the lyricist invited Arlen, with whom he had written the hit tune "It's Only a Paper Moon," to collaborate on the revue. Arlen had been writing risqué numbers with Ted Koehler for The Cotton Club in Harlem and welcomed the opportunity to compose music for comedy songs in a mainstream production. The revue also proved to be a stepping stone in the career of Bert Lahr. The actor's unique voice inspired Arlen and Harburg to write songs satirizing romantic and operatic stage clichés and helped Lahr evolve from a bumbling buffoon into an adept comic performer. Arlen later maintained "no one could write for him better than E.Y. and myself."

The original Broadway production opened at the Winter Garden Theatre on August 27, 1934 and closed on March 16, 1935 after a run of 237 performances. It was devised and staged by John Murray Anderson, choreographed by Robert Alton, and starred Ray Bolger, Brian Donlevy, Luella Gear, Frances Williams, Dixie Dunbar, and Esther Junger in addition to Lahr. Among those who contributed to the costume design were Raoul Pene Du Bois and Irene Sharaff.

Time called the production "the season's first first-rate entertainment."

A concert revival at the Library of Congress on March 22, 2010 was recorded and released on CD by PS Classics. This performance featured Rebecca Luker, Brad Oscar and Faith Prince, and the orchestra was conducted by Aaron Gandy.

== Song list ==
Act One

- Life Begins (at Exactly 8:40 or Thereabouts)
- Spring Fever
- You're a Builder-Upper
- My Paramount-Publix-Roxy-Rose
- Shoein' the Mare
- Quartet Erotica
- Fun to Be Fooled
- C'est la Vie
- What Can You Say in a Love Song (That Hasn't Been Said Before)

Act Two

- Let's Take a Walk Around the Block
- Things
- (All) The Elks and the Masons
- I Couldn't Hold My Man
- A Weekend Cruise (Will You Love Me Monday Morning as You Did on Friday Night?)
- It Was Long Ago
- I'm Not Myself
- Life Begins at City Hall (Beautifying the City)
