= Joan Peters (dancer) =

American dancer and educator (1939–2022)

- Born: May 16, 1939
- Died: November 9, 2022 (aged 83)
- Occupations: Dancer, choreographer, educator
- Years active: 1950s–2019
- Notable work: Katherine Dunham Technique, Alvin Ailey American Dance Theater
- Awards: Katherine Dunham Legacy Award

Joan Peters (May 16, 1939 – November 9, 2022) was an American dancer, choreographer, and educator, best known for her mastery of the Katherine Dunham Technique and her work with the Alvin Ailey American Dance Theater. Over a career spanning more than sixty years, Peters played a crucial role in preserving the Dunham Technique, a dance methodology blending Afro-Caribbean movement with modern dance principles. She was one of the few officially recognized master teachers of Dunham’s method and a passionate advocate for the accessibility of dance education to diverse communities, including the visually impaired and deaf.

== Early life and education ==
Joan Peters was born on May 16, 1939, in the United States. Her exposure to dance began at the age of five when she enrolled in classes under Syvilla Fort at the Katherine Dunham School of Theatre Dance. The Dunham School, established by the pioneering African American dancer Katherine Dunham, provided rigorous training in classical ballet, modern dance, and African and Caribbean movement traditions. By the age of eleven, Peters was assisting in teaching classes, demonstrating a natural gift for instruction and leadership. Her early training in Dunham’s anthropological approach to movement—studying dance as an integral part of cultural expression—shaped her lifelong commitment to dance education.

Peters continued her training under Dunham herself, eventually becoming one of the few individuals granted official certification as a Master Teacher of the Dunham Technique.

== Career ==
=== Performance career ===
In the 1960s, Peters performed with the Alvin Ailey American Dance Theater, one of the most influential modern dance companies of the 20th century. Touring internationally, she performed in landmark Ailey productions that helped define African American modern dance on a global scale. In addition to Ailey, Peters danced with other prominent companies and collaborated with artists dedicated to advancing modern dance as a vehicle for cultural storytelling. Her performances were marked by expressive movement, technical brilliance, and a deep connection to the themes of African American heritage and resilience.

=== Teaching and the Dunham Technique ===
Peters dedicated the majority of her career to teaching and preserving the Katherine Dunham Technique, which integrates classical ballet, modern dance, and African and Caribbean dance forms. Recognized as one of only three officially certified Dunham Master Teachers, she played a pivotal role in ensuring that Dunham’s legacy continued to be passed on to future generations. From 1978 to 2019, Peters served as Chairperson for the Dunham Technique at The Ailey School, the official school of the Alvin Ailey American Dance Theater. During her 41-year tenure, she mentored thousands of students, instilling in them both technical precision and an understanding of the cultural significance of Dunham’s work. Alvin Ailey Dance Theater

Beyond The Ailey School, Peters also taught at:

- Harkness House for Ballet Arts – Training students in both ballet and modern dance.
- Holy Family Academy – Establishing dance programs for young students.
- Arts Connection – A nonprofit dedicated to integrating arts education into public school curricula.

She also conducted masterclasses and workshops across the United States and internationally, ensuring that the Dunham Technique remained a cornerstone of modern dance training.

== Advocacy ==
Peters was a passionate advocate for making dance accessible to all individuals, regardless of physical ability. She spearheaded programs for visually impaired and blind students, using verbal descriptions and tactile teaching methods to help them experience movement. Additionally, she developed **specialized dance classes for deaf students**, ensuring that they could engage with rhythm and movement through vibrations and visual cues.

Her work in this field was groundbreaking, helping to establish best practices for teaching dance to students with disabilities.

== Mentorship and cultural contributions ==
As a mentor, Peters was deeply committed to guiding young dancers not only in technique but also in understanding the **historical and cultural roots of dance. She emphasized that dance was more than movement—it was a means of storytelling, resistance, and connection to heritage.

She encouraged students to see dance as a form of activism, highlighting how Dunham herself had used dance to challenge racial stereotypes and advocate for social justice. Many of Peters’ former students went on to become leading dancers, choreographers, and educators in their own right, carrying forward her teachings.

== Honors and recognition ==
Throughout her career, Peters received numerous accolades for her contributions to dance and education, including:

- The Katherine Dunham Legacy Award** – Recognizing her lifelong dedication to preserving and teaching the Dunham Technique.
- Alvin Ailey School Distinguished Educator Award** – Honoring her impact on generations of dancers.
- New York City Arts Educators Award** – For her work in making dance education accessible to underprivileged communities.

== Death and legacy ==
Joan Peters died on November 9, 2022, from congestive heart failure. Her death marked the loss of one of the foremost educators in the Dunham Technique and a beloved figure in the dance community.

Her legacy endures in the thousands of students she mentored, many of whom continue to teach and perform worldwide. The Dunham Technique remains an essential part of modern dance curricula, in large part due to Peters’ efforts in preserving its principles. Dance institutions and scholars continue to honor her contributions, ensuring that her influence is felt for generations to come.

== See also ==
- Katherine Dunham
- Alvin Ailey American Dance Theater
- Syvilla Fort
- Katherine Dunham Technique
- Modern dance
- African American dance
