= Dunham School of Dance and Theatre =

Defunct performing arts school in New York City

Location
- 220 West 43rd Street; New York City, New York; United States

Information
- Former name: Katherine Dunham School of Dance
- Established: 1944
- Founder: Katherine Dunham
- Closed: 1954

The Dunham School of Dance and Theatre was a performing arts school founded by dancer and choreographer Katherine Dunham in New York City. Initially established in collaboration with dance educator Franziska Boas in 1944, it developed into an interdisciplinary institution offering courses in cultural studies and Caribbean research. The school had an interracial staff and student body, and also served as a training center for the Katherine Dunham Company and the Experimental Group. The school was located at 220 West 43rd in Manhattan from 1945 until its closure in 1954.

== History ==
=== Founding and early years ===
In January 1944, Dunham and dance educator Franziska Boas established a school at 323 West 21st Street in Manhattan. Sharing an interest in anthropology and dance as a means of anti-racist activism, they sought to expand opportunities for Black dancers. However, their partnership dissolved within a year amid disagreements over management and pedagogy. Despite their differences, the two maintained an amicable relationship.

In January 1945, while on tour, Dunham announced that she had purchased a $200,000 mansion at 14 East 71st Street on Manhattan's Upper East Side, which she intended to use as her residence and the site of her dance school. The purchase challenged racial barriers in one of the city's wealthiest neighborhoods. Her white secretary, Eileen Hamilton, handled negotiations with the owner, Walter S. Gubelman, and his lawyer, who did not learn Dunham's identity as the buyer until a reporter from the New York Herald Tribune called to confirm the sale.

Two weeks after Dunham announced the purchase, Gubelman sought to persuade her to withdraw from the deal. A plastic surgeon who lived nearby subsequently joined the owners of 18 East 71st Street in a lawsuit seeking to prevent Dunham from moving in, arguing that a dance school would violate residential zoning regulations. The New York Supreme Court rejected the their claim, affirming Dunham's constitutional right to purchase the property, but granted a temporary injunction against her moving in. Dunham ultimately withdrew from the deal, citing zoning restrictions that required approval from the New York State Board of Regents to operate a school in the neighborhood.

In February 1945, Dunham held auditions for her Tropical Revue at Caravan Hall on 59th Street, where she also housed the Katherine Dunham School of Dance during that summer. When theatrical producer Lee Shubert offered her a one-woman show, Dunham declined, preferring to perform with members of her company. Knowing that Shubert owned the building at 220 West 43rd Street in Manhattan's Broadway theater district, she persuaded him to lease her its top floor at a low rent. The school's colorful interiors were designed and decorated by George Bergal. Following renovations, the school opened at the new location in September 1945.

=== Expansion and curriculum ===
In 1946, the Katherine Dunham School of Dance expanded and became known as the Dunham School of Dance and Theatre. The school emphasized rigorous technical training while encouraging students to explore dance through interdisciplinary study. The curriculum reflected Dunham's anthropological background, extending beyond dance and theater to include cultural studies and Caribbean research.

Alongside ballet, modern dance, and Dunham Technique, the school offered the following courses: General Anthropology, Spanish, French, Music Appreciation, General Philosophy, Playwriting, History of Drama, History of Dance, Comedy Techniques, Dance Notation, and Introductory Psychology, Haitian drumming, and folklore. Its faculty in the Dance Division included Todd Bolender (ballet), Marie Bryant (tap and boogie), and José Limón (modern dance). Dunham Technique was taught by Tommy Gomez, Archie Savage, Lavinia Williams, and Syvilla Fort, who also taught ballet. The instructors in the Drama Division included Herbert Berghof (acting), John Pratt (visual design), and Karl Vollmoeller (history of drama, play writing). Member's of Dunham's company such as Henri Augustin, Lenwood Morris, and Lucille Ellis were also instructors.

Dunham established the Experimental Group as a second company, recruiting promising young performers from her school. While the Katherine Dunham Company consisted entirely of Black dancers, the new ensemble was interracial. It also provided a way for Dunham's institutions to engage with local communities through performances at schools and fundraising events.

=== Tuition and scholarships ===
The school attracted substantial enrollment, with the Amsterdam News reporting unusually large student registrations in the summer of 1946. Its 1946–47 brochure listed 16 elementary classes in Dunham Technique, nine in elementary ballet, and one in José Limón's elementary modern dance. A 12-week course cost $30, while students pursuing a certificate were required to complete 25 credit hours per week at a cost of $350 per term.

In 1945, the American Council on African Education announced the establishment of a Katherine Dunham Scholarship, funded by a pledge of approximately $2,000 from Dunham. The award was intended to cover four years of study at an American university for an African student selected by the council.

Despite its high enrollment, the school faced financial difficulties. In August 1946, Dunham told a reporter that the school cost $6,000 a month to operate, but expressed confidence that it would eventually become self-sustaining. To help cover its expenses, she took her dance company on tour. A statement of income and expenditures for the week of September 21, 1946, recorded expenses of $1,633, compared with tuition income of $183.26. Students received financial assistance through federal GI Bill funding and work-study scholarships known as Student Aid. Other revenue included $570.42 from the school's fundraising event, La Boule Blanche, a private donation of $30, and a $900 contribution from Dunham herself.

Dunham frequently reinvested additional income in hiring instructors and expanding the curriculum rather than reducing the school's debts. Approximately a year after its opening, she estimated that the school owed more than $45,000, much of it to her personally. Despite the financial strain, she remained enthusiastic about realizing her educational vision.

=== Closure ===
The school closed abruptly in February 1954 due to management issues while Dunham was in Italy.

== Notable alumni ==
The school had an interracial student body at a time when racial segregation restricted opportunities for Black performers in American dance and theater. Over the years, the school attracted students who would go on to prominence in a variety of fields, including Eartha Kitt, Marlon Brando, James Dean, Arthur Mitchell, Peter Gennaro, Chita Rivera, José Ferrer, Jennifer Jones, and Rudi Gernreich.
