= William Willis =

William Willis may refer to:

== Politicians ==
- William Willis (Maine politician) (1794–1870), American politician and historian, mayor of Portland, Maine, 1857
- William Willis Garth (1828–1912), American politician
- William Willis (British politician) (1835–1911), British politician, MP for Colchester 1880–1885
- William Jarvis Willis (1840–1884), New Zealand politician
- William Nicholas Willis (1858–1922), Australian politician

== Others ==
- William Downes Willis (1790–1871), British clergyman, theologian and author
- William Willis (physician) (1837–1894), British physician
- William Willis (inventor) (1841–1923), British inventor
- William Willis (sailor) (1893–1968), rafter and adventurer
- William Hailey Willis (1916–2000), American classicist
- William S. Willis (1921–1983), ethnohistorian and pioneer in African American anthropology
- William Willis (artist) (born 1943), American artist

== See also ==
- Bill Willis (1921–2007), American football player
