= Franziska Boas =

American dancer (1902–1988)

Franziska M. Boas
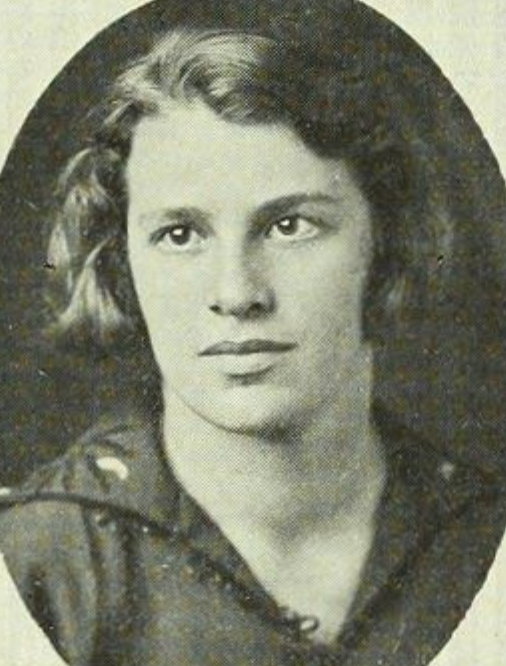
- Franziska Boas, from the 1923 yearbook of Barnard College
- Born: January 8, 1902; New York City, New York, U.S.
- Died: December 22, 1988 (aged 86); Sandisfield, Massachusetts, U.S.
- Education: Barnard College (BA)
- Occupations: Dancer, choreographer, percussionist, educator, author, movement therapist
- Relatives: Franz Boas (father); Ernst Philip Boas (brother)

Franziska Marie Boas (January 8, 1902 – December 22, 1988) was an American dancer. She is best known for her work with percussion, pioneering dance therapy, and using dance as social activism.

== Biography ==
Boas was born in New York City. She was the daughter of Franz Boas and Marie Krackowizer, both anthropologists. She was the youngest of six children and went to school in Englewood, New Jersey. In 1923, she graduated with a B.A. in zoology and chemistry from Barnard College. While at Barnard, she incorporated dance into her studies by working with leaders such as Bird Larson and, through a summer program, Mary Wigman.

Boas founded in 1933 the Boas School of Dance, an interracial school, where she taught "creative" and improvisational dance. There were many notable students who were taught at the school, including Merce Cunningham and John Cage. Her focus was not on creating technically perfect dancers; instead, she wanted to use dance as a method of exploring oneself and the body. She sought to break down social barriers, and believed this could be done by bringing people of all races together through dance.

In 1944, Boas and dancer Katherine Dunham to establish a dance school at 323 West 21st Street in Manhattan. Their partnership was short-lived, and the two subsequently established separate institutions.

She volunteered at Bellevue Hospital from 1939 to 1943 where she worked in collaboration with Dr. Lauretta Bender to pioneer dance therapy. There she used dance to observe the behaviors of schizophrenics and those with other serious mental health issues. Boas wrote The Function of Dance in Human Society which talked about how dance could facilitate mental therapy. Her career spanned from 1933 to 1965.

Boas died on December 22, 1988, in Sandisfield, Massachusetts, aged 86, having suffered from Alzheimer's disease.

== Compositions ==
- "Changing Tensions" for percussion quartet (c. 1939) published by Media Press Inc.

== Recordings ==
"ORIGINS: forgotten percussion works, vol. 1", Percussion Art Ensemble, directed by Ron Coulter, (Kreating SounD KSD 4, December 2012)

== Bibliography ==
- Boas, Franziska. "Creative dance." Child Psychiatric Techniques. (1978). Print.
- Boas, Franziska. "Dance in the liberal arts college curriculum." Impulse (1953): 27–29. Print.
- Boas, Franziska. "The Negro and the Dance as an Art." Phylon. 10.1 (1949): 38- . Print.
- Boas, Franziska. The Function of Dance in Human Society. New York: Boas School, 1944. Print.
- Boas, Franziska. "Psychological Aspects in the Practice and Teaching of Creative Dance." The Journal of Aesthetics and Art Criticism. 2.7 (1942): 3- . Print.
- Boas, Franziska. "Teaching the Lay Dancer." The Progressive Physical Educator (1941): 24–26. Print.
- Boas, Franziska. "Notes on percussion accompaniment for the dance." Dance Observer 5.5 (1938): 71–72. Print.
