= Esther Junger =

American modern dancer and choreographer (1902–1987)

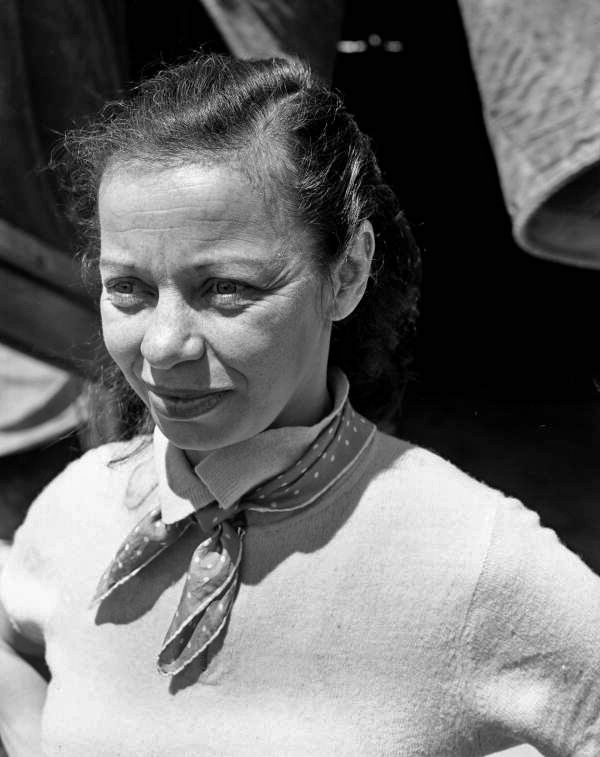
- Esther Junger (1947)
- Born: March 20, 1902; New York City
- Died: September 21, 1987 (aged 85); Santa Monica, California
- Other name: Esther Junger Klempner
- Occupations: Dancer, choreographer, dance director

Esther Junger (March 20, 1902–September 21, 1987) was a 20th-century American modern dancer and choreographer.

== Life and work ==
Esther Junger was born in New York City in 1902. The peak of her artistic career was in the 1930s, after which she became "increasingly preoccupied with commercial work." She had been part of the "New World Dancers and in the productions of the Neighborhood Playhouse," when she made her solo debut in 1930 at the Guild Theater, where she "gave a highly satisfactory account of herself" including a dance to a poem by Richard Harrison called "Green Pastures." She also performed "a number of solo recitals in New York City and appeared as a featured dancer in Gluck-Sandor's [productions of the modern ballets] El Amor Brujo and Petrouchka as well as a number of other productions."

Initially trained by "the group of the late Bird Larson," she was awarded a fellowship, along with José Limón and Anna Sokolow, to the Bennington School of the Dance at Bennington College in 1937. The New York Times argued that of the three resulting choreographies, Junger's product "represents the factor of greatest interest." Per the Times, "aside from a few Broadway revues, Esther Junger has made but three New York appearances since the breakup of the old Larsen ensemble." Limón recalled her work in his memoir, writing, "Esther Junger, for all her undisputed talent and accomplishment as a performer, was not a practiced choreographer. Her piece, a primitive ritual of betrothal, with herself as the bride and me as the bridegroom and a large group of girls as a chorus, was, as I remember, competent but uninspired. Esther was brilliant in her solo passages. I served her well, supporting and lifting her." Her 1939 show at the 92nd Street Y was given an unalloyed rave in the New York Times, with the critic John Martin writing "Esther Junger recently gave her first New York recital in more than three years, and danced as beautifully as anybody has danced hereabouts in many a long day...In any case, it would be a general boon if she could be put into wider circulation, for there are few dancers in the field who have as much to contribute at this particular moment, or who could be counted on to make as many friends not only for themselves but for the dance."

Elsewhere she did the original choreography and staging for Dark of the Moon, Tis of Thee, Parade, Billy Rose's Diamond Horseshoe, and Dear Judas, in which she also danced. She choreographed a Milton Berle show called Spring in Brazil. In the late 1940s she choreographed for the Ringling Brothers and Barnum & Bailey circus. In 1950 she choreographed the "Willie the Weeper" segment of Ballet Ballads. In 1951 she was the choreographer for the Jackie Gleason comedy hour. In 1970 she was involved in the organization of the Inner City Repertory Dance Company in the city of Los Angeles. Esther Junger Klempner died in Santa Monica, California in 1987.
