= Mary Mon Toy =

Japanese American actress and entertainer

- Born: Mary Teruko Watanabe; 3 June 1916; Seattle
- Died: 7 December 2009
- Education: Broadway High School, Juilliard School
- Occupations: Actor, secretary, showgirl (1946–)
- Known for: The World of Suzie Wong

Mary Mon Toy (June 3, 1916 – December 7, 2009) was a Japanese American actor, showgirl, and secretary. She is best known for her role in the Broadway production of The World of Suzie Wong as Minnie Ho.

== Early life ==
On June 3, 1916, Mary Mon Toy was born Mary Teruko Watanabe to Mon Yusa Watanabe and Yoshizo Watanabe. Toy's birthplace is under some contention since some sources claim she was born in Seattle, Washington whereas other sources claim she was born in Honolulu. Her father – Yoshizo Watanabe – was the first Japanese chiropractor in Washington. She had one brother, Frank Chusei Watanabe.

In 1934, she graduated from Broadway High School. From 1934 to 1935, she then went to attend William Business School, where she met her future husband and fellow nisei, Shigesato Okada. They married on September 28, 1941.

On April 28, 1942, Mary and Okada were in the first group remanded to Camp Harmony, as part of the incarceration of Japanese Americans during World War II, following the signing of Executive Order 9066. They were transferred in August to the Minidoka War Relocation Center. She was released from Minidoka in 1943.

== Career ==
After she was released from Minidoka, she separated from her husband, dissolved their marriage, and moved to New York City to train in voice at Juilliard School. During her time at Juilliard, she worked as a secretary and also began her career as a chorus girl after answering a 1946 ad for "Oriental Girls, five feet six and over" for the China Doll nightclub. To avoid discrimination, she adopted a "more Chinese-sounding name" and began going by Mary Mon Toy.

Her time as a showgirl helped her start her career on Broadway, where she starred in notable plays such as Street Scene in 1949, House of Flowers in 1954, and The World of Suzie Wong in 1958. In 1975, she starred as Yamato in the Santa Anita '42 play about a Japanese incarceration during World War II that was written by Allan Knee and directed by Steven Robman. According to one of Toy's friends, she did not tell anyone about her Japanese background or experience in Camp Harmony or Minidoka.

Other roles that she had with various traveling theater productions are Bloody Mary in South Pacific, Lady Thiang in The King and I, and Helen Chao in Flower Drum Song. In addition to theater roles, Toy also appeared on television shows, such as Nurse, One of Our Own, Ryan's Hope, and Kojak. She was the voice actor for Jade Snow Wong in the PBS special, Jade Snow. She also starred in films such as the 1979 film All That Jazz.

== Activism ==
In 1968, she picketed against the Yellowface casting in New York City Center's remake of The King and I with a sign that read "If Caucasians are given Oriental roles, why doesn't it work both ways? Oriental Actors of America." Toy was a member of the American Federation of Television and Radio Artists (AFTREA) and in 1986 she joined AFTREA members in solidarity against victims of apartheid.

== Death ==
She died on December 7, 2009, in New York City.
