= Vanoye Aikens =

American dancer and actor

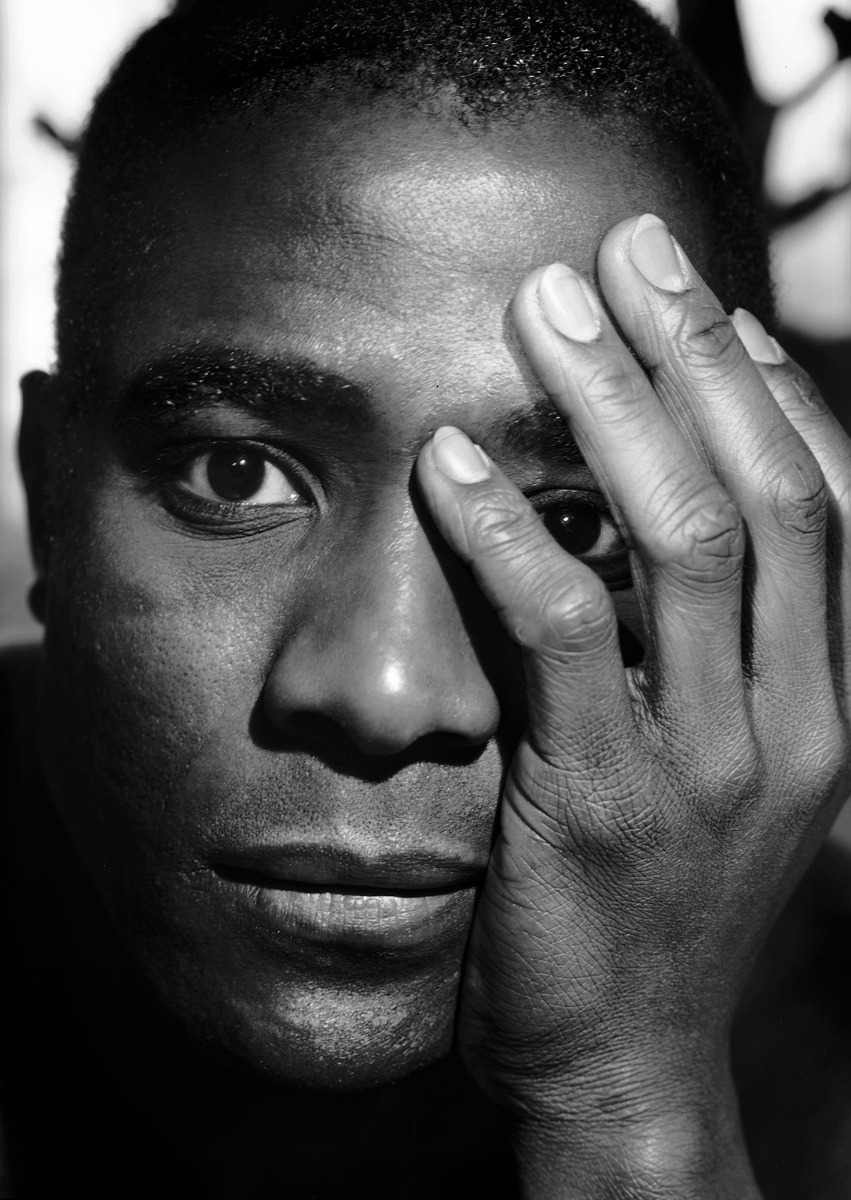
- Portrait of Vanoye Aikens by Annemarie Heinrich, 1958.
- Born: 27 November 1922; Georgia, USA
- Died: August 24, 2013 (aged 90); Los Angeles, California, USA
- Burial place: Jonesboro, Georgia, USA
- Known for: Dancing with the Katherine Dunham Company

Vanoye William Aikens (27 November 1922 – 24 August 2013), also known as Van Aikens, was an American dancer and actor. He was known for his work with fellow dancer Katherine Dunham, with whom he danced internationally on stage and screen.

== Biography ==
Aikens was born in Georgia on 27 November 1922. He attended Morehouse College but was unable to complete his degree due to financial issues. He went on to serve in the U.S. Navy.

Afterwards, he traveled to New York City, where Katherine Dunham Company dancer Lenwood Morris encouraged him to audition for the dance troupe. He joined the troupe as a student in 1943. He went on to perform on Broadway with the company through the 1940s and 1950s, as well as tour through United States, Europe and South America until the troupe disbanded in 1963.

After the dance group was disbanded, Aikens briefly worked in film as an actor, singer, and dancer. He then taught dance as a lecturer at the Danshögskolan in Sweden, as well as in Germany and Spain until the mid-1980s. Later, he returned to the United States, where he worked with Katherine Dunham and the Alvin Ailey Dance Company in Los Angeles.

Aikens died in Los Angeles on August 24, 2013. He is buried in Jonesboro, Georgia.

== Filmography ==
Year	Title	Role	Director(s)
1954	Mambo	Dancer (uncredited)	Robert Rossen
1960	The Revolt of the Slaves (La rivolta degli schiavi)	Iface (credited as "Van Aikens")	Nunzio Malasomma
1961	Barabbas (Barabba)	Prisoner in Mines (uncredited)	Richard Fleischer
1961	The Story of Joseph and His Brethren (Giuseppe venduto dai fratelli)	Slave on the hunting expedition (uncredited)	Irving Rapper, Luciano Ricci
1961	Rage of the Buccaneers (Gordon, il pirata nero)	Does not appear (credited as "Van Aikens")	Mario Costa
1961	The Giant of Metropolis (Il gigante di Metropolis)	Dancer (uncredited)	Umberto Sarpelli
1961	Goliath and the Vampires (Maciste contro il vampiro)	Amahil (credited as "Van Aikens")	Sergio Corbucci, Giacomo Gentilomo
1961	Tropico di notte	Dancer (credited as "Van Aikins")	Renzo Russo
1962	Eve (Eva)	Nightclub dancer (credited as "Van Eicken")	Joseph Losey
1962	Sodom and Gomorrha	Specialty Dancer (uncredited)	Robert Aldrich
1963	Cleopatra	Dancer (uncredited)	Joseph L. Mankiewicz
1971	I Eat Your Skin	Robey	Del Tenney
