= House of Flowers (musical) =

- Music: Harold Arlen
- Lyrics: Harold Arlen; Truman Capote
- Book: Truman Capote
- Basis: Truman Capote's short story "House of Flowers"
- Productions: 1954 Broadway 1968 off-Broadway 2003 New York City concert

House of Flowers is a musical by Harold Arlen (music and lyrics) and Truman Capote (lyrics and book). A short story of the same name was published in Breakfast at Tiffany's (1958).

== Synopsis ==
The story concerns two neighboring bordellos that battle for business in an idealized Haitian setting. One of the sex workers, Ottilie, turns down a rich lord to marry a poor mountain boy named Royal. Her madam plots to keep her by having Royal sealed in a barrel and tossed into the ocean. Royal escapes the watery death by taking refuge on the back of a turtle. The lovers are eventually married and live happily ever after.

== Production history ==
This was Capote's first musical, and was the first theatrical production outside of Trinidad and Tobago to feature the new Caribbean instrument—the steel pan. It was produced by Saint Subber who was also responsible for Kiss Me, Kate and seven plays by Neil Simon.

In the early 1950s Truman Capote became further involved in the performing arts. He was approached once again by producer Saint Subber, who was interested in his recent story "House of Flowers": would he be interested in adapting the work as a musical play for Broadway? Despite the difficulties they had had in turning "The Grass Harp" into a stage play, Capote agreed for a second time to collaborate with producer Saint Subber and set to work. Much of the writing was done in the Italian fishing village of Portofino; but Capote and Jack Dunphy found time to travel to Switzerland and Paris before turning to America, where Capote met again with Saint Subber and continued his work in the musical. After a Philadelphia try-out, the show opened on Broadway on December 30, 1954 at the Alvin Theatre and played for 165 performances. The director was Peter Brook. The cast included Pearl Bailey, Diahann Carroll, Juanita Hall, Ray Walston, Carmen de Lavallade, Alvin Ailey, Mary Mon Toy, and Geoffrey Holder (who also provided a section of choreography and went on to direct the 1992 revival starring Patti LaBelle). Most of the original orchestral score by Ted Royal has been lost, but the piano score survives.

== Cast ==
House of Flowers featured a remarkable gem of an opening night cast.

- Pearl Bailey as Madame Fleur
- Alvin Ailey as Alvin
- Miriam Burton as Mother / Duchess of the Sea
- Diahann Carroll as Otille alias Violet (her Broadway debut)
- Leu Comacho as One of the Sisters Meringue
- Joseph Comadore as Townsperson
- Carmen de Lavallade as Carmen
- Dino Di Luca as Monsieur Jamison
- Hubert Dilworth as Townsperson
- Solomon Earl Green as Don’t
- Juanita Hall as Madame Tango
- Dolores Harper as Tulip
- Winston George Henriques as Do
- Phillip Hepburn as Townsperson
- Geoffrey Holder as The Champion
- Louis Johnson as Townsperson
- Cristyne Lawson as Townsperson
- Mary Louise as Townsperson
- Don McKayle as Townsperson
- Arthur Mitchell (dancer) as Townsperson
- Mary Mon Toy as Mamselle Honolulu
- Ada Moore as Gladiola
- Enid Mosier as Pansy
- Walter Nicks as Townsperson
- Frederick O’Neal as The Houngan
- Albert Popwell as Townsperson
- Don Redman as Chief of Police
- Pearl Reynolds as Mamselle Ibo-Lele
- Sabu as Townsperson
- Margot Small as One of the Sisters Meringue
- Rawn Spearman as Royal
- Herbert Stubbs as Townsperson
- Glory Van Scott as Mamselle Cigarette
- Ray Walston as Captain Jonas

== Reception and legacy ==
Although the show received generally poor reviews, the dance-rhythm infused score has been praised for its mix of blues and calypso.

Oliver Messel won the Tony Award for Best Scenic Design.

In 2003, Columbia Masterworks reissued the original cast recording. In addition to such tunes as "A Sleepin' Bee" and "Don't Like Goodbyes", the CD also included bonus tracks of "Mardis Gras Waltz" (Percy Faith and His Orchestra), "Two Ladies in the Shade" (Enid Mosier), "Ottilie and the Bee" (Truman Capote), and "A Sleepin' Bee" (a demo recording by Harold Arlen).

== Revivals ==
There was an unsuccessful off-Broadway revival in 1968 at Theater de Lys. In 2003, there was an Encores! production, starring Tonya Pinkins and Armelia McQueen as the battling bordello madams and Maurice Hines as Captain Jonas, the smuggler. The virginal Ottilie was played by Nikki M. James, and the mountain boy, Royal, was played by Brandon Victor Dixon. Roscoe Lee Browne played the voodoo priest, Houngan.

== Musical numbers ==
Act 1

- "Waitin'" — Pansy, Tulip and Gladiola
- "One Man Ain't Quite Enough" — Madame Fleur
- "Madame Tango's Tango" — Madame Tango and Tango Belles
- "A Sleepin' Bee" — Ottilie alias Violet, Pansy, Tulip and Gladiola
- "Bamboo Cage" — The Champion, the Steel Band, Do, Don't, Pansy, Tulip, Gladiola, Madame Tango, Chief of Police and the Ensemble
- "House of Flowers" — Royal and Ottilie
- "Two Ladies in de Shade of de Banana Tree" — Pansy, Gladiola, Carmen, Tulip and the Ensemble
- "What Is a Friend For?" — Madame Fleur
- "A Sleepin' Bee (Reprise)" — Ottilie and Royal
- "Mardi Gras" — Mother, Carmen, Alvin and the Ensemble
- "I Never Has Seen Snow" — Ottilie

Act II

- "Husband Cage" — Pansy, Tulip, Gladiola and the Ensemble
- "Has I Let You Down?" — Madame Fleur, Pansy, Tulip and Gladiola
- "Voudou" — Houngan and the Ensemble
- "Slide, Boy, Slide" — Madame Tango, Alvin and the Ensemble
- "Don't Like Goodbyes" — Madame Fleur
- "Turtle Song" — Royal, Ottilie and the Ensemble
- "Bamboo Cage (Reprise)" - The Company
- "Two Ladies in de Shade of de Banana Tree (Reprise)" - The Company
