= House of Flowers (short story) =

Short story by Truman Capote

"The House of Flowers" (Note: The original 1950 publication was titled "The House of Flowers", but subsequent publications generally printed the story as "House of Flowers".) is a 1950 short story by Truman Capote, first published in Botteghe Oscure Quaderno VI and reprinted in Breakfast at Tiffany's. It was adapted into a musical of the same name.
