= Archie Savage =

American actor, dancer, and choreographer (1914–2003)

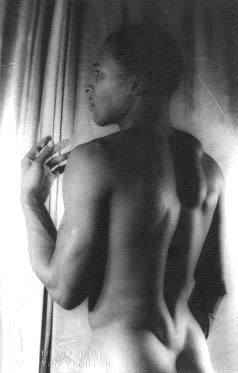
Archie Savage, by Carl van Vechten

Archie Savage (April 19, 1914 — February 14, 2003) was an American dancer, choreographer, and film and theatre actor. He was a pioneer of the African-American modern dance. For several years he was a partner of Katherine Dunham in her dance company. He was among the teachers of Dunham Technique at the Dunham School of Dance and Theatre.

Savage became interested in dancing while he was a student in public schools in New York.

Savage was one of the earliest black men to portray an astronaut in film. Another one, in the same year of 1960, was Julius Ongewe in the East German/Polish film The Silent Star (known in the US as First Spaceship on Venus).

The Archie Savage Dancers appear in the movie, “The Glenn Miller Story” and are acknowledged in the film's credits. In one scene, they appear on a screen in a recording studio as the band is recording the song “Tuxedo Junction,” to which they are performing.

== Filmography ==
- 1941: Carnival of Rhythm (starring with Katherine Dunham), American short
- 1944: Jammin' the Blues (dancer), American short about jazz, part of the Melody Master series
- 1954: Vera Cruz (a cutthroat gunslinger), American film
- 1960: Space-Men (space station pilot Al ), Italian science fiction film
- 1969: Bootleggers (Jeremiah), Italian-Spanish crime-action film
- 1954: His Majesty O'Keefe (Boogulroo), American adventure film
- 1967: Death Rides a Horse (Gambler), Italian Spaghetti Western
- 1970: Notes Towards an African Orestes (singer), Italian film
