= Glory Van Scott =

American dancer, educator, actress and writer (b. 1947)

- Born: June 1, 1947 (age 78); Chicago, Illinois, U.S.
- Education: Goddard College, Union Institute & University
- Occupation(s): educator actress writer dancer choreographer
- Years active: 1960s - the present
- Career
- Former groups: Katherine Dunham; Agnes de Mille; Talley Beatty

Glory Van Scott (born June 1, 1947) is an educator, writer, actress and dancer. She is a former principal dancer with the Katherine Dunham, Agnes de Mille and Talley Beatty dance companies and has performed in the United States and around the world.

== Early life and education ==
Van Scott was born on June 1, 1947, in Chicago, Illinois, the daughter of Dr. and Ms. Thomas Van Scott, and was raised near Greenwood, Mississippi. She is of African American, Choctaw, and Seminole ancestry.

Van Scott was a student at Oakland Elementary School, Dunbar Vocational High School, and graduated from Ethical Culture High School in New York City. She studied art, dance, and drama classes at The Abraham Lincoln Center, in Chicago, where she met Paul Robeson and Charity Bailey. Van Scott spent summers in Ethical Culture Camp in New York.

She received a BA and MA from Goddard College and a PhD from Union Graduate School, previously known as Antioch College Union Graduate School.

== Career ==
Van Scott was mentored in theatre by Vinnette Justine Carroll. She modelled for Wilhelmina Models and was a principal dancer for the Katherine Dunham, Agnes de Mille, and Talley Beatty dance companies, and joined the American Ballet Theatre.

She appeared in the following Broadway productions:

- House of Flowers (1954)
- Kwamina (1961)
- The Great White Hope (1968)
- Billy Noname (1970)

In 1978, she appeared on film in the featured role of the Rolls-Royce Lady in The Wiz and the 2003 film Rhythms of the Saints.

As a playwright and author, Van Scott has written and composed nine musicals including Miss Truth, and books such as Baba and the Flea (1972), and Glory: A Life Among Legends (2018).

== Educator ==
She taught theater at the Pennsylvania Governor's School for the Arts and Theater as Social Change at Fordham University.

== Legacy ==
Elizabeth Catlett created a bronze bust depicting Van Scott in 1981. In 2002, Van Scott received the Katherine Dunham Legacy Award.

== Personal ==
Van Scott's cousin Emmett Till was murdered in 1955.
