= William S. Willis =

Scholar of anthropology, focused on African American anthropology

William Shedrick Willis, Jr.
- Born: July 11, 1921; Waco, Texas, U.S.
- Died: August 8, 1983 (aged 62)
- Education: 1942 B.A. history, Howard, University, 1955 Ph.D in anthropology Columbia, University
- Spouse: Georgine Upshur
- Parent: Father William S. Willis Sr.

William Shedrick Willis Jr. (July 11, 1921 – August 8, 1983) was an ethnohistorian and an early pioneer in African American anthropology. He is best known for his publication of "Skeletons in the Anthropological Closet". He was the first Black scholar to the faculty of Southern Methodist University. While at SMU, he was instrumental in the establishing of the African American Studies Program.

== Early life ==
Willis was an only child born in Waco, Texas. His family moved to Dallas, Texas when he was very young. Both of his parents were wealthy, and college educated. His father was William S. Willis Sr. He was a high school principal of a black high school. It is noted that his father resigned due to unfair treatment from the school board. After resigning from being a principal he started a construction company to build homes for poor black people. His father was a grand chancellor of the Colored Knights of Pythians of Texas. It is noted that the move to Dallas in the 1920s was due in response to warnings from the Ku Klux Klan. Willis spent summers in Chicago, where his family owned a home. His father died when he was very young. After the death of his father, Willis and his mother took a round-the-world tour.

Willis graduated from Booker T. Washington High School in Dallas, Texas in 1938. After graduating from Booker T. Washington High School he went to Howard University, in Washington, D.C. At Howard University Willis majored in history, and minored in sociology and literature. His major professor and mentor was Rayford Logan. Willis was introduced to Negro history and culture while at Howard, university. He became interested in the Black Historic Movement. While at Howard he also studied with Sterling Allen Brown, E. Franklin Frazier, Alain LeRoy Locke, Charles H. Wesley, and Ralph Bunche. In 1942 he graduated from Howard University cum laude. After graduating from Howard University Willis volunteered for the United States Coast Guard. He left the Coast Guard in 1944.

== Career ==
Willis attended Howard University and graduated cum laude (A.B., in 1942). In 1945, Willis began graduate study at Columbia University in New York City in political science. He later changed his focus of study to anthropology. He received his Ph.D. from Columbia University in 1955. While at Columbia University he did research on Native Americans of the Southeast United States. His dissertation was "Colonial Conflict and the Cherokee Indians (1710-1760)" in 1955. In addition to his research on the indigenous peoples of the South East, he wrote about Blacks in America and relationships between Native Americans, Blacks, and Whites. He did research work on the history of anthropology, and racism in anthropology. He studied, and wrote about the career of Franz Boas.

In 1949, Willis was awarded the John Hay Whitney Opportunity Fellowship to fund his research dissertation at Columbia, university. His dissertation was entitled Colonial Conflict and the Cherokee Indians, 1710–1760. The dissertation focused on documenting Cherokee American society and culture, sociocultural change, assimilation, and adaptation in a colonial environment using a historical approach in anthropology.

His classmates while at Columbia University became noted in the field of anthropology such as; Eric Wolf, Sidney Mintz, Morton Fried, Robert F. Murphy, Elliott P. Skinner, and Marvin Harris.

From 1955 to 1964 Willis was only able to get part-time teaching at Columbia and City College of New York. He felt that the difficulty was due to the fact that employment opportunities for black scholars in white schools were minimal as were the opportunities for anthropologists in black schools. During this time he pursued his research interest in early colonial Southeastern North America publishing two articles on Indian culture patterns and Black-Indian-White relations.

The articles focused on ethnohistorical issues and were published in the journal Ethnohistory. Like his dissertation these articles established his significant abilities as an ethnohistorian. Both articles corrected the record regarding certain issues Willis felt had been misreported by ethnologists. His approach was innovative. In addition to examining the standard historical treatises, he looked for "ethnographic facts found now and then in routine documents written by busy officials and semi-literate traders" and compared these facts with the extended descriptions of more sophisticated authors (Willis 1957: 125). The scholarship was enlivened by the personal interest Willis took in the five groups he studied: Cherokee, Choctaw, Chicasaw, Creeks and Seminoles.

Willis taught part-time from 1955 to 1964 at Columbia University and City of college of in New York City part-time. During this period his research was in early colonial Southeastern North America. He published two articles that focused on ethnohistorical issues in Indian culture patterns, and Black-Indian-White relations. The five indigenous group he studied and focussed on were the; Choctaw, Chicasaw, Cherokee, Creeks and Seminoles. Chicasaw,

In 1964 Willis returned to Dallas, Texas after spending many years in New York City. He accepted a teaching position at Bishop College in Dallas, Texas in the Division of Social Sciences, and in the Department of Sociology. He also accepted a position at Southern Methodist University teaching anthropology. His appointment made him the first Black scholar appointed to the faculty of Southern Methodist University. While at SMU Willis' work focused on studying African American history and culture. His works focused on the Southern Colonial Frontier.

In 1972, he resigned from Southern Methodist University in protest to racist treatment from the faculty in the Department of Anthropology. After resigning from SMU Willis continued to teach at Columbia University summer sessions until 1975.

In 1978, the Willis' moved to Philadelphia, Pennsylvania. Which was the hometown of his wife Georgine E. Upshur. While in Philadelphia Willis had access to the collections at the American Philosophical Society Library. Throughout his career Willis corresponded with many other anthropologists and students in the field of anthropology. He corresponded with George M. Foster, Morton Fried, Elliott P. Skinner, Sidney Mintz, Marvin Harris, Dell Hymes, Charles H. Fairbanks, Rayford Logan, and Arthur Fauset. Rayford Logan was his lifelong mentor.

=== Contributions ===
A letter of recommendation written by Morton Fried recognized Willis' contribution to Anthropology. He is quoted in the letter of recommendation by Morton Fried as "one of the country's authorities on the Colonial period in the Southeastern United States." Fried also stated that Willis had "an unusually acute grasp of the historical problems (of this area) in terms of the triangle constituted by Indians, Negroes and the European settlers." "Any thorough study of the race problem in any culture," he concluded "requires some use of Willis' contribution".

Willis documented examples of patrilineal practices in Native American Southeastern North American groups that had been previously seen as matrilineal. He found 18th century materials that had been previously ignored. His hypothesis was that matrilineal institutions and patrilineal practices could co-exist.

In Willis' 1957 article "The Nation of Bread" his research approach combined the historical method and the Boasian anthropology. From this approach he stated in a letter to Charles H. Fairbanks, that the confederacies of the Creeks were "confederacies of different cultural units." Which in effect meant that the trial unit was not the nation but the town, and that each town had a different culture.

=== Publications ===
- 1955 - Colonial Conflict and the Cherokee Indians, 1710–1760.(Dissertation).University Microfilms, Ann Arbor (Dissertation).
- 1963 - Divide and rule: Red, white, & black in the southeast
- 1957 - The Nation of Bread, Ethnohistory
- 1963 - Divide and Rule: Red, White, and Black in the Southeast," Journal of Negro History, 48(3):157-176.
- 1972 - Skeletons in the anthropological closet
- 1972 - Reinventing Anthropology (co-author)
- 1975 - Franz Boas and the study of Black folklore
- 1975 - The New Ethnicity: Perspectives from Ethnology
- 2008 - Franz Boas and W.E.B. Du Bois at Atlanta University by Rosemary Levy Zumwalt (Author), William Shedrick Willis (Author). (The papers of William Shedrick Willis from (1921–1983)

=== Memberships ===
- Fellow of the American Anthropological Association
- American Association for the Advancement of Science
- American Society for Ethnohistory
- The Society for American Archaeology
- The American Association of University Professors

== Quotes ==
We must...view anthropology from the perspectives of colored

peoples, from Richard Wright's 'frog perspectives' of looking upward from below. When we do this, the importance of color erupts, and the world of Edward Burnett Tylor, Franz Boas, and A.R. Radcliffe-Brown becomes articulated with the world of W.E.B. Du Bois, Richard Wright (author), and Frantz Fanon. The 'frog perspectives' reveal surprising insights about anthropology, and these insights are the skeletons in the

anthropological closet.

— William S. Willis, Jr

I was led into Anthropology by the appeal of the scientific antiracism of the Basin tradition.

— William S. Willis, Jr

In 1945, I began graduate study at Columbia University, first in political science and then in anthropology. I shifted to anthropology because I assumed that this discipline was the vanguard in the attack against racist thought. I tried to reconcile the concentration on North American Indians that then prevailed in anthropology with my strong interests in history and in the study of Black people by selecting Black-Indian relations in Southeastern North America as the problem for my dissertation.

— William S. Willis

(In regards to Boas) Willis wrote:

In the first place, he soft-pedalled what the white man had done. He did not explicitly refer to the slave trade, slavery, segregation, imperialism, discrimination, exploitation, lynching. Instead, he resorted to euphemism: innocuous gloss of these events. Moreover, Boas did not advocate protest and agitation. He did not advocate immediatism. He did not advocate that Negroes should immediately agitate and protest for their rights. He did not condemn what whites had and were doing to Negroes.

— William S. Willis
