= Katherine Dunham Company =

First African-American modern dance company

The Katherine Dunham Company, a troupe of dancers, singers, actors and musicians, was the first African-American modern dance company.

== History ==
Founded in Chicago, it grew out of Ballet Nègre, a student troupe founded in 1930 by Katherine Dunham (1909–2006), which later became the Negro Dance Group.

The company had successful runs on Broadway and in other major American cities. In a New York Times review on February 19, 1940, dance critic John Martin wrote of Dunham: "Her performance with her group last Sunday at the Windsor Theatre may very well become a historic occasion, for certainly never before in all efforts of recent years to establish Negro dance as a serious medium has there been so convincing and authoritative an approach."

Beginning in the 1940s, Dunham took her troupe on a series of highly acclaimed world tours. The Dunham Company helped launch the career of many African-American performers of the day. Dunham alumni include Alvin Ailey, Rosalie King, Frances Davis, Eartha Kitt and Walter Nicks. Classes in Katherine Dunham Technique are still taught in New York City at both the 92nd Street YMHA and at the Fashion Institute of Technology, by former company member Dana McBroom-Manno. McBroom-Manno was a featured dancer in the Metropolitan Opera's production of Aida, choreographed by Katherine Dunham, the first African-American choreographer at the Met since Hemsley Winfield set the dances for The Emperor Jones in 1933.

Successful revues featuring the company included the acclaimed 1946 production Bal Nègre.

Dunham also established the Experimental Group as a second company, recruiting promising young performers from the Dunham School of Dance and Theatre. Unlike the Dunham company, which was then composed entirely of Black dancers, the Experimental Group was interracial. In addition to providing opportunities for young performers, the group helped maintain public support for Dunham’s institutions by performing at schools and benefit fundraisers, often for little or no pay. These engagements gave students performance experience while allowing the principal company to focus on better-paying work.

== See also ==
- Modern dance
- Postmodern dance
- 20th-century concert dance
- List of dance companies
