= Bird Larson =

American dance teacher (1887–1927)

- Born: c. 1887; Mora, Minnesota
- Died: September 23, 1927; Brooklyn, New York
- Other names: Bird Larsen, Bird Sophia Larson, Birdie Sophie Larson, Bird L. Berglin, Bird L. Steele
- Occupations: Dancer, physical education teacher, dance teacher

Bird Larson (b. c. 1887 – September 23, 1927) was a physical education instructor at Barnard College (Teacher's College, Columbia University) in New York. She became an influential figure in the early development of American modern dance.

== Life and work ==
Larson was born around 1887 in Mora, Minnesota, to Swedish immigrant parents.

She was influenced by the ideas of François Delsarte. Larsen's system "was to have enormous influence in subsequent years on physical educational dance. Later she took her system out of the educational and into the professional field and she came to be recognized as the first technician of American dance." Dance historians view her as "a bridge" between Gertrude Colby and Margaret H'Doubler, and she "was the first college educator to look at dance as separate from any dependency on music and storylines."

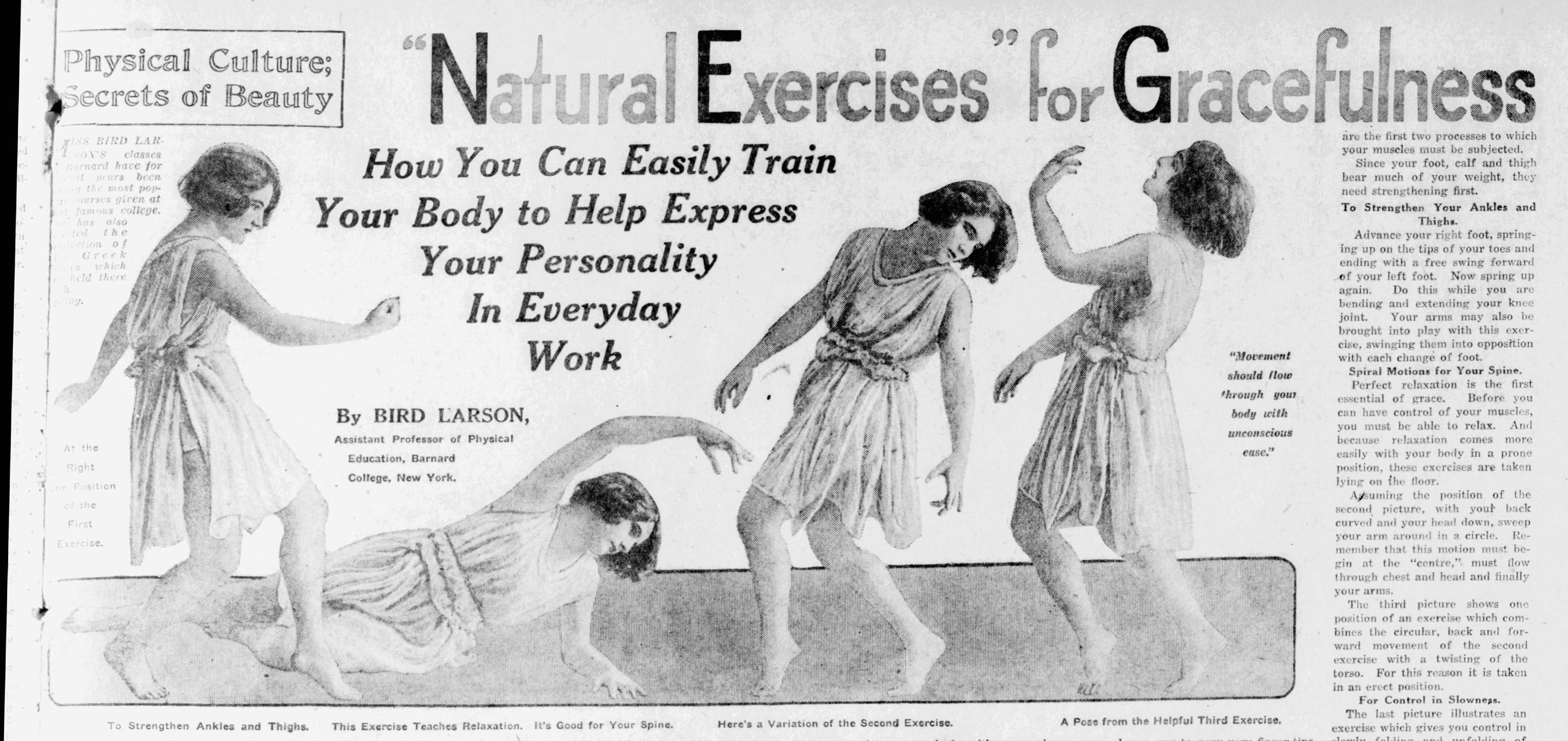
Bird Larson - Natural Exercises for Gracefulness (1922)

She did some liturgical choreography: "Between 1920 and 1924 at St. Mark's-in-the-Bowrie, for example, Miss Bird Larson directed a yearly dance-rendering of the Della Robbia Annunciation." She eventually left Barnard to focus on "dance pageantry" and "teaching and exploring natural movement forms privately, at a rented studio."

She died at age 39 at Brooklyn Hospital of cardiac arrest and a pulmonary embolism seven days post-op from a Caesarean section operation. Her sudden death inspired José Limón's 1929 solo, Go Down Death. Scholastic examination of her work began in the 1960s under the influence of the National Dance Guild.
