= Lavinia Williams =

American dancer and dance educator (1916–1989)

- Williams in 1955
- Born: July 2, 1916; Philadelphia, Pennsylvania, U.S.
- Died: July 19, 1989 (aged 73); Port-au-Prince, Haiti

Lavinia Williams (July 2, 1916 – July 19, 1989), who sometimes went by the married name Lavinia Williams Yarborough, was an American dancer and dance educator who founded national schools of dance in several Caribbean countries.

== Biography ==
Grace Lavinia Poole Williams was born the second of six children in Philadelphia, Pennsylvania, in a family of West Indian descent. She grew up in Portsmouth, Virginia and Brooklyn, New York, and studied at Washington Irving High School and then the Art Students League of New York, where she joined the American Negro Ballet, beginning her career in a number of dance companies and stage productions.

Her work included classical ballet, folk, modern, musicals, and, most importantly, Caribbean dance, which she mastered in the 1940s while working with Katherine Dunham. She spent nearly the entirety of the years from 1953 through to the late 1980s teaching dance and founding and developing national schools of dance in Haiti, Guyana, and the Bahamas.

She spent most of the last years of her life teaching in New York City, but left the United States for Haiti in February 1984. The New York Times reported that she died of a heart attack in Port-au-Prince, although several other sources and Beryl Campbell reported it as "some kind of food poisoning". Diana Dunbar, Lavinia's friend and student, arranged her funeral service.

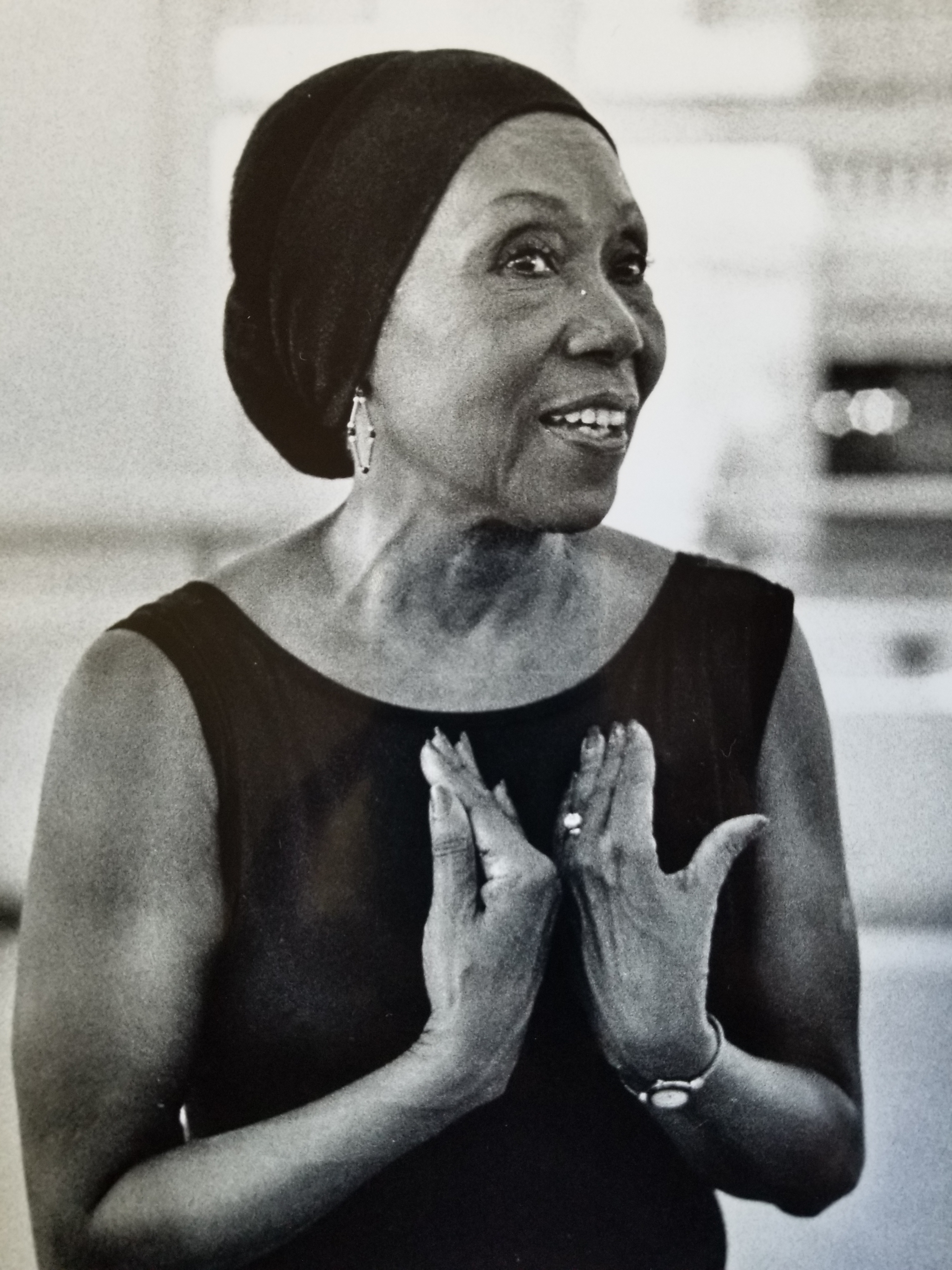
Lavinia Williams teaching at the last dance workshop she gave in New York City.

=== Marriages and children ===
Williams married Léon Theremin in the mid-1930s. In 1938, Theremin suddenly returned to the Soviet Union, where he was imprisoned and later sent to a labor camp. Williams never saw him again.

She married Shannon Yarborough in the late 1940s and had two daughters, Sharron and Sara. The younger daughter, Sara Yarborough-Smith, followed in her mother's footsteps as a professional dancer with the Alvin Ailey American Dance Theater, the Dance Theater of Harlem and the Robert Joffrey Ballet, among others.

Lavinia visited Clara Rockmore in 1974 and expressed happiness in discovering that Theremin was still alive; shortly afterwards she and Theremin started corresponding, with Theremin even proposing remarriage.

== Featured in ==
- Aschenbrenner, Joyce. Katherine Dunham: reflections on the social and political contexts of Afro-American dance. New York: CORD: 1981.

== Bibliography ==
- She wrote the 49-page pamphlet Haiti Dance printed by Brönners Druckerei in 1959.
- She wrote various other small pamphlets on dance, for example: Ballets d'Haïti: Bamboche creole, 24 pages, 1974; Dances of the Bahamas & Haiti, 1980, 12 pages.
