= Katherine Dunham =

American dancer and choreographer (1909–2006)

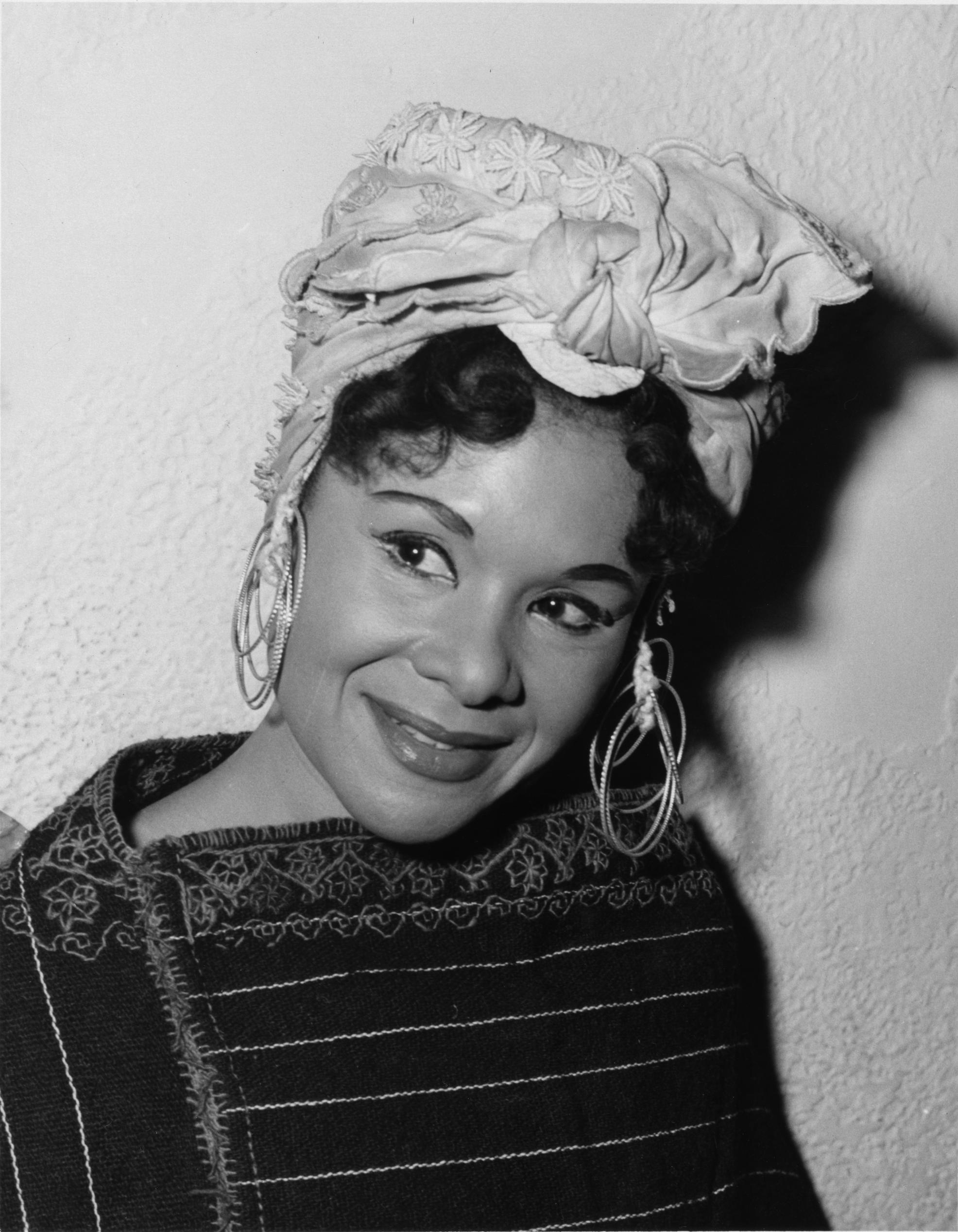
- Dunham in 1956
- Born: Katherine Mary Dunham; June 22, 1909; Glen Ellyn, Illinois, U.S
- Died: May 21, 2006 (aged 96); New York City, U.S
- Education: University of Chicago
- Occupations: Modern dancer, choreographer, author, educator, activist
- Spouses: Jordis W. McCoo (m. 1931; div. 1938) John Pratt (m. 1941; died 1986)

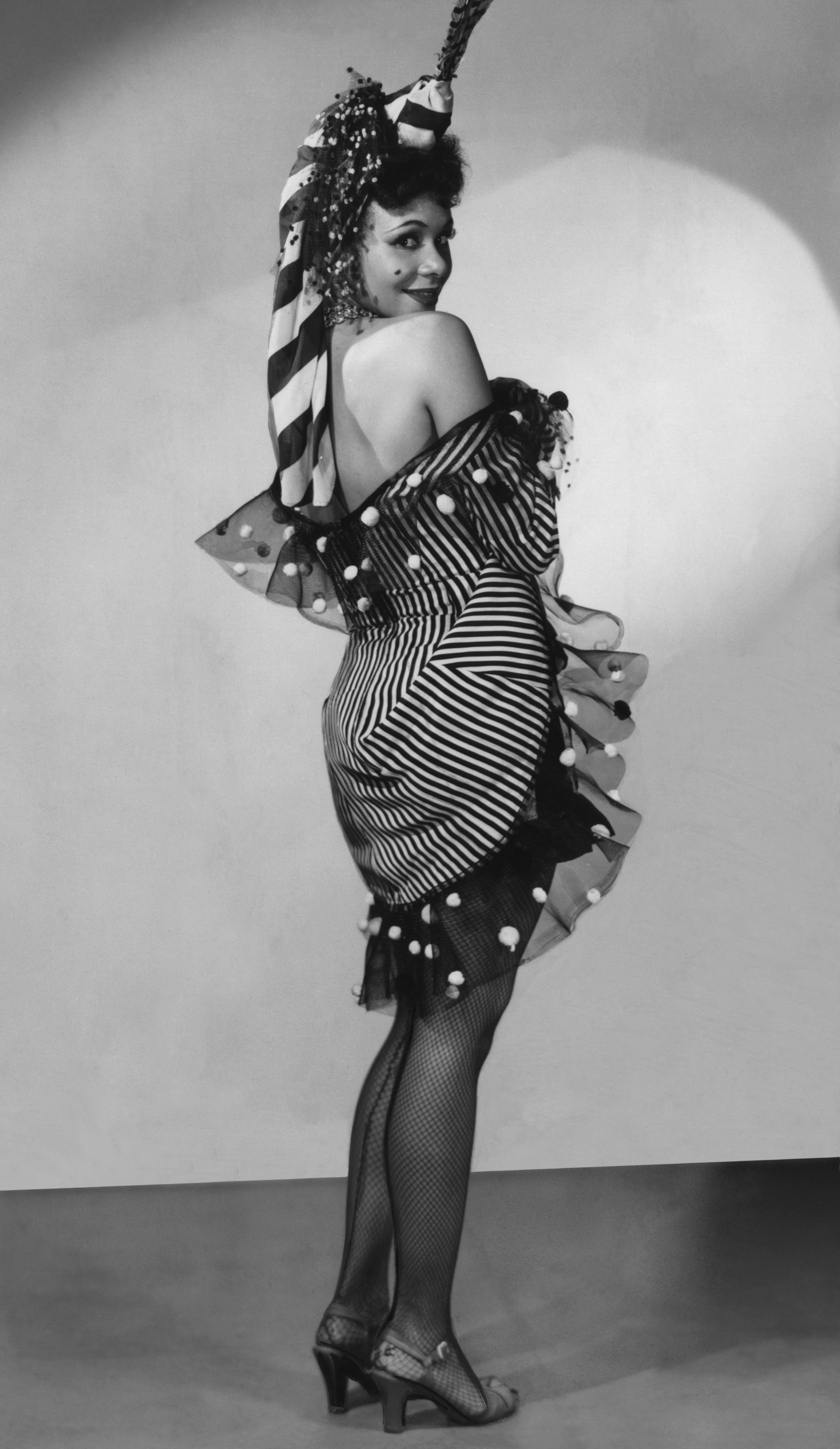
Katherine Dunham in Tropical Review, Martin Beck Theatre

Katherine Mary Dunham (June 22, 1909 – May 21, 2006) was an American dancer, choreographer, anthropologist, and social activist. One of the most renowned modern dance artists of the 20th century, she has been called the "matriarch and queen mother of black dance."

While a student at the University of Chicago, Dunham also performed as a dancer, ran a dance school and earned an early bachelor's degree in anthropology. Receiving a postgraduate academic fellowship, she went to the Caribbean to study the African diaspora, ethnography and local dance. She returned to graduate school and submitted a master's thesis to the anthropology faculty. She did not complete the other requirements for that degree, however, as she realized that her professional calling was performance and choreography.

At the height of her career in the 1940s and 1950s, Dunham was renowned throughout Europe and Latin America and was widely popular in the United States. The Washington Post called her "dancer Katherine the Great." She operated the Dunham School of Dance and Theatre for a decade, and for almost 30 years she maintained the Katherine Dunham Dance Company, the only self-supported American black dance troupe at that time. Over the course of her career, she choreographed more than ninety individual dances. Dunham was an innovator in African-American modern dance as well as a leader in the field of dance anthropology, or ethnochoreology. She also developed the Dunham Technique, a method of movement to support her dance works.

== Early life ==
Katherine Mary Dunham was born on June 22, 1909 in a Chicago hospital. Her father, Albert Millard Dunham, was a descendant of slaves from West Africa and Madagascar. Her mother, Fanny June Dunham, who, according to Dunham's memoir, possessed Indian, French Canadian, English, and probably African ancestry, died when Dunham was four years old. She had an older brother, Albert Jr., with whom she had a close relationship. After her mother died, her father left the children with their aunt Lulu on Chicago's South Side. At the time, the South Side of Chicago was experiencing the effects of the Great Migration where Black southerners attempted to escape the Jim Crow South and poverty. Along with the Great Migration, came White flight and her aunt Lulu's business suffered and ultimately closed as a result. This led to a custody battle over Katherine and her brother, brought on by their maternal relatives. This meant neither of the children was able to settle into a home for a few years. However, after her father remarried, Albert Sr. and his new wife, Annette Poindexter Dunham, took in Katherine and her brother. The family moved to a predominantly white neighborhood in Joliet, Illinois. There, her father ran a dry-cleaning business.

Dunham became interested in both writing and dance at a young age. In 1921, a short story she wrote when she was 12 years old, called "Come Back to Arizona", was published in volume 2 of The Brownies' Book.

She graduated from Joliet Central High School in 1928, where she played baseball, tennis, basketball, and track; served as vice-president of the French Club, and was on the yearbook staff. In high school she joined the Terpsichorean Club and began to learn a kind of modern dance based on the ideas of Europeans [Émile Jaques-Dalcroze] and [Rudolf von Laban]. At the age of 15, she organized "The Blue Moon Café", a fundraising cabaret to raise money for Brown's Methodist Church in Joliet, where she gave her first public performance. While still a high school student, she opened a private dance school for young black children.

== Academia and Anthropology ==
After completing her studies at Joliet Junior College in 1928, Dunham moved to Chicago to join her brother, Albert, at the University of Chicago.

During her time in Chicago, Dunham enjoyed holding social gatherings and inviting visitors to her apartment. Such visitors included ethnomusicologist Alan Lomax, novelist and anthropologist Zora Neale Hurston, Robert Redfield, Bronisław Malinowski, A.R. Radcliffe-Brown, Fred Eggan, and many others that she met in and around the University of Chicago. After noticing that Katherine enjoyed working and socializing with people, her brother suggested that she study Anthropology. University of Chicago's anthropology department was fairly new and the students were still encouraged to learn aspects of sociology, distinguishing it from other anthropology departments in the US that focused almost exclusively on non-Western peoples. The Anthropology department at Chicago in the 1930s and 40s has been described as holistic, interdisciplinary, with a philosophy of liberal humanism, and principles of racial equality and cultural relativity.

Dunham officially joined the department in 1929 as an anthropology major, while studying dances of the African diaspora. As a student, she studied under anthropologists such as A.R. Radcliffe-Brown, Edward Sapir, Melville Herskovits, Lloyd Warner and Bronisław Malinowski. Under their tutelage, she showed great promise in her ethnographic studies of dance. Redfield, Herskovits, and Sapir's contributions to cultural anthropology, exposed Dunham to topics and ideas that inspired her creatively and professionally. For example, she was highly influenced both by Sapir's viewpoint on culture being made up of rituals, beliefs, customs and artforms, and by Herkovits' and Redfield's studies highlighting links between African and African American cultural expression. It was in a lecture by Redfield that she learned about the relationship between dance and culture, pointing out that Black Americans had retained much of their African heritage in dances. Dunham's relationship with Redfield in particular was highly influential. She wrote that he "opened the floodgates of anthropology" for her. He showed her the connection between dance and social life giving her the momentum to explore a new area of anthropology, which she later termed "Dance Anthropology".

Katherine Dunham both received her Bachelor's degree in anthropology from, and began her Master's degree at the University of Chicago, and later did an extensive anthropological study, particularly in the Caribbean. Throughout her life she also received 14 different Doctorate degrees from various universities including: Harvard, Brown, and Dartmouth.

In 1935, Dunham was awarded travel fellowships from the Julius Rosenwald and Guggenheim foundations to conduct ethnographic fieldwork in Haiti, Jamaica, Martinique, and Trinidad studying the dance forms of the Caribbean. One example of this was studying how dance manifests within Haitian Vodou. Dunham also received a grant to work with Professor Melville Herskovits of Northwestern University, whose ideas about retention of African culture among African Americans served as a base for her research in the Caribbean.

After her research tour of the Caribbean in 1935, Dunham returned to Chicago in the late spring of 1936. In August she was awarded a bachelor's degree, a Ph.B., bachelor of philosophy, with her principal area of study being social anthropology. She was one of the first African-American women to attend this college and to earn these degrees. In 1938, using materials collected ethnographic fieldwork, Dunham submitted a thesis, The Dances of Haiti: A Study of Their Material Aspect, Organization, Form, and Function,. to the Department of Anthropology in partial fulfillment of the requirements for a master's degree. However, fully aware of her passion for both dance performance, as well as anthropological research, she felt she had to choose between the two. Although Dunham was offered another grant from the Rockefeller Foundation to pursue her academic studies, she chose dance. She did this for many reasons. However, one key reason was that she knew she would be able to reach a broader public through dance, as opposed to the inaccessible institutions of academia. Never completing her required coursework for her graduate degree, she departed for Broadway and Hollywood.

Despite her choosing dance, Dunham often voiced recognition of her debt to the discipline: "without [anthropology] I don't know what I would have done….In anthropology, I learned how to feel about myself in relation to other people…. You can't learn about dances until you learn about people. In my mind, it's the most fascinating thing in the world to learn".

== Ethnographic fieldwork ==
Her field work in the Caribbean began in Jamaica, where she lived for several months in the remote Maroon village of Accompong, deep in the mountains of Cockpit Country. (She later wrote Journey to Accompong, a book describing her experiences there.) Then she traveled to Martinique and to Trinidad and Tobago for short stays, primarily to do an investigation of Shango, the African god who was still considered an important presence in West Indian religious culture. Early in 1936, she arrived in Haiti, where she remained for several months, the first of her many extended stays in that country through her life.

While in Haiti, Dunham investigated Vodun rituals and made extensive research notes, particularly on the dance movements of the participants. She recorded her findings through ethnographic fieldnotes and by learning dance techniques, music and song, alongside her interlocutors. This style of participant observation research was not yet common within the discipline of anthropology. However, it has now become a common practice within the discipline. She was one of the first researchers in anthropology to use her research of Afro-Haitian dance and culture for remedying racist misrepresentation of African culture in the miseducation of Black Americans. She felt it was necessary to use the knowledge she gained in her research to acknowledge that Africanist esthetics are significant to the cultural equation in American dance. Years later, after extensive studies and initiations in Haiti, she became a mambo in the Vodun religion. She also became friends with, among others, Dumarsais Estimé, then a high-level politician, who became president of Haiti in 1949. Somewhat later, she assisted him, at considerable risk to her life, when he was persecuted for his progressive policies and sent in exile to Jamaica after a coup d'état.

== Dancer and choreographer ==
=== From 1928 to 1938 ===
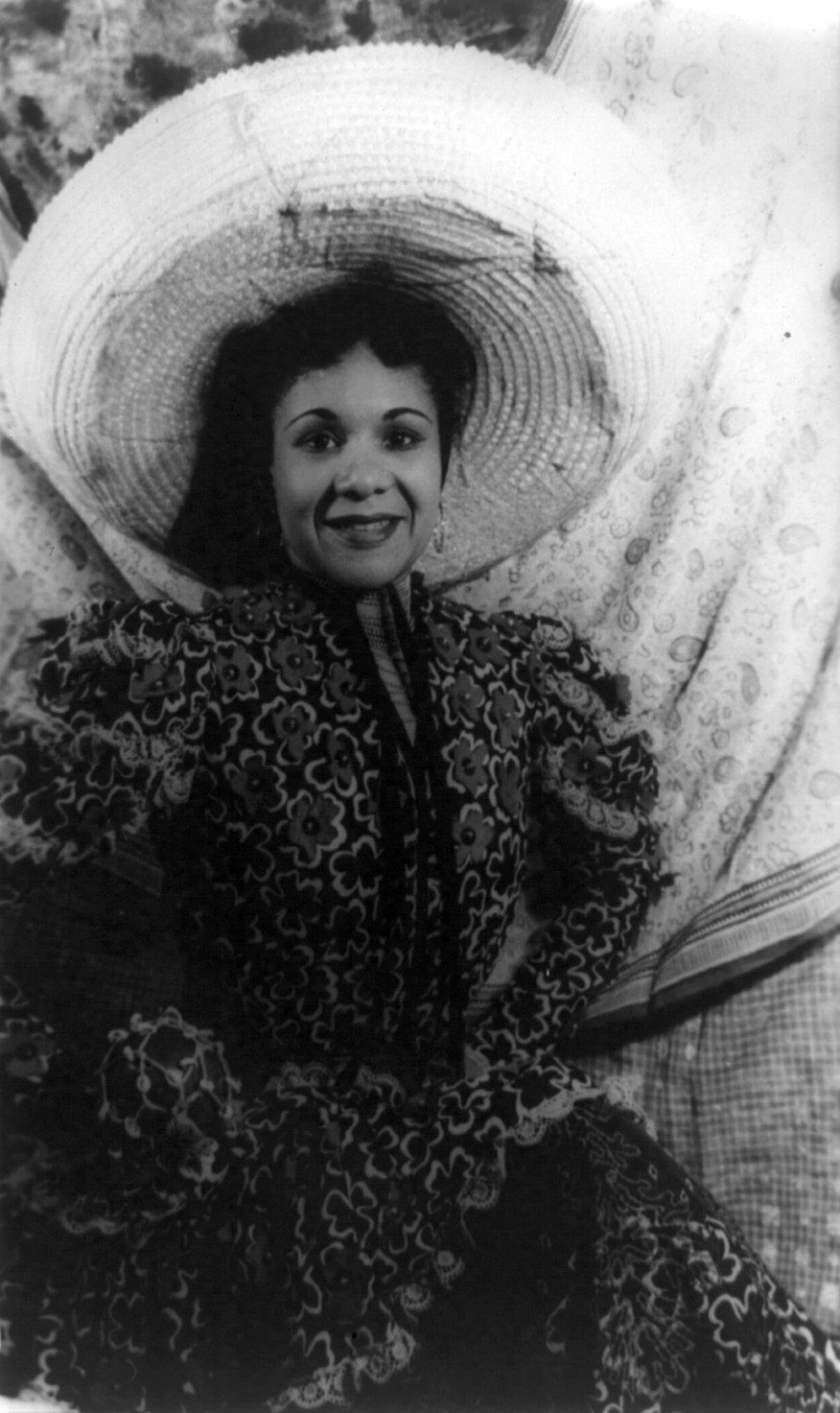
Katherine Dunham in 1940, by Carl Van Vechten

Dunham's dance career first began in Chicago when she joined the Little Theater Company of Harper Avenue. In 1928, while still an undergraduate, Dunham began to study ballet with Ludmilla Speranzeva, a Russian dancer who had settled in Chicago, after having come to the United States with the Franco-Russian vaudeville troupe Le Théâtre de la Chauve-Souris, directed by impresario Nikita Balieff. Dunham also studied ballet with Mark Turbyfill and Ruth Page, who became prima ballerina of the Chicago Opera. Additionally, she worked closely with Vera Mirova who specialized in "Oriental" dance. Through her ballet teachers, she was also exposed to Spanish, East Indian, Javanese, and Balinese dance forms.

In 1931, at the age of 21, Dunham formed a group called Ballets Nègres, one of the first black ballet companies in the United States. The group performed Dunham's Negro Rhapsody at the Chicago Beaux Arts Ball. After this well-received performance in 1931, the group was disbanded. Encouraged by Speranzeva to focus on modern dance instead of ballet, Dunham opened her first dance school in 1933, calling it the Negro Dance Group. It was a venue for Dunham to teach young black dancers about their African heritage.

In 1934–1936, Dunham performed as a guest artist with the ballet company of the Chicago Opera. Ruth Page had written a scenario and created the choreography for William Grant Still's ballet La Guiablesse ("The Devil Woman"), based on a Martinican folk tale in Lafcadio Hearn's Two Years in the French West Indies. It opened in Chicago in 1933, with a black cast and with Page dancing the title role. The next year the production was repeated with Katherine Dunham in the lead and with students from Dunham's Negro Dance Group in the ensemble. Her dance career was interrupted in 1935 when she received funding from the Rosenwald Foundation which allowed her to travel to Jamaica, Martinique, Trinidad, and Haiti for eighteen months to explore each country's respective dance cultures. The result of this trip was Dunham's Master's thesis entitled "The Dances of Haiti".

Having completed her undergraduate work at the University of Chicago and decided to pursue a performing career rather than academic studies, Dunham revived her dance ensemble. In 1937 she traveled with them to New York to take part in A Negro Dance Evening, organized by Edna Guy at the 92nd Street YMHA. The troupe performed a suite of West Indian dances in the first half of the program and a ballet entitled Tropic Death, with Talley Beatty, in the second half. Upon returning to Chicago, the company performed at the Goodman Theater and at the Abraham Lincoln Center. Dunham created Rara Tonga and Woman with a Cigar at this time, which became well known. With choreography characterized by exotic sexuality, both became signature works in the Dunham repertory. After her company performed successfully, Dunham was chosen as dance director of the Chicago Negro Theater Unit of the Federal Theatre Project. In this post, she choreographed the Chicago production of Run Li'l Chil'lun, performed at the Goodman Theater. She also created several other works of choreography, including The Emperor Jones (a response to the play by Eugene O'Neill) and Barrelhouse.

At this time Dunham first became associated with designer John Pratt, whom she later married. Together, they produced the first version of her dance composition L'Ag'Ya, which premiered on January 27, 1938, as a part of the Federal Theater Project in Chicago. Based on her research in Martinique, this three-part performance integrated elements of a Martinique fighting dance into American ballet.

=== From 1939 to the late 1950s ===
In 1939, Dunham's company gave additional performances in Chicago and Cincinnati and then returned to New York. Dunham had been invited to stage a new number for the popular, long-running musical revue Pins and Needles 1940, produced by the International Ladies' Garment Workers Union. As this show continued its run at the Windsor Theater, Dunham booked her own company in the theater for a Sunday performance. This concert, billed as Tropics and Le Hot Jazz, included not only her favorite partners Archie Savage and Talley Beatty, but her principal Haitian drummer, Papa Augustin. Initially scheduled for a single performance, the show was so popular that the troupe repeated it for another ten Sundays.

Based on this success, the entire company was engaged for the 1940 Broadway production Cabin in the Sky, staged by George Balanchine and starring Ethel Waters. With Dunham in the sultry role of temptress Georgia Brown, the show ran for 20 weeks in New York. It next moved to the West Coast for an extended run of performances there. The show created a minor controversy in the press.

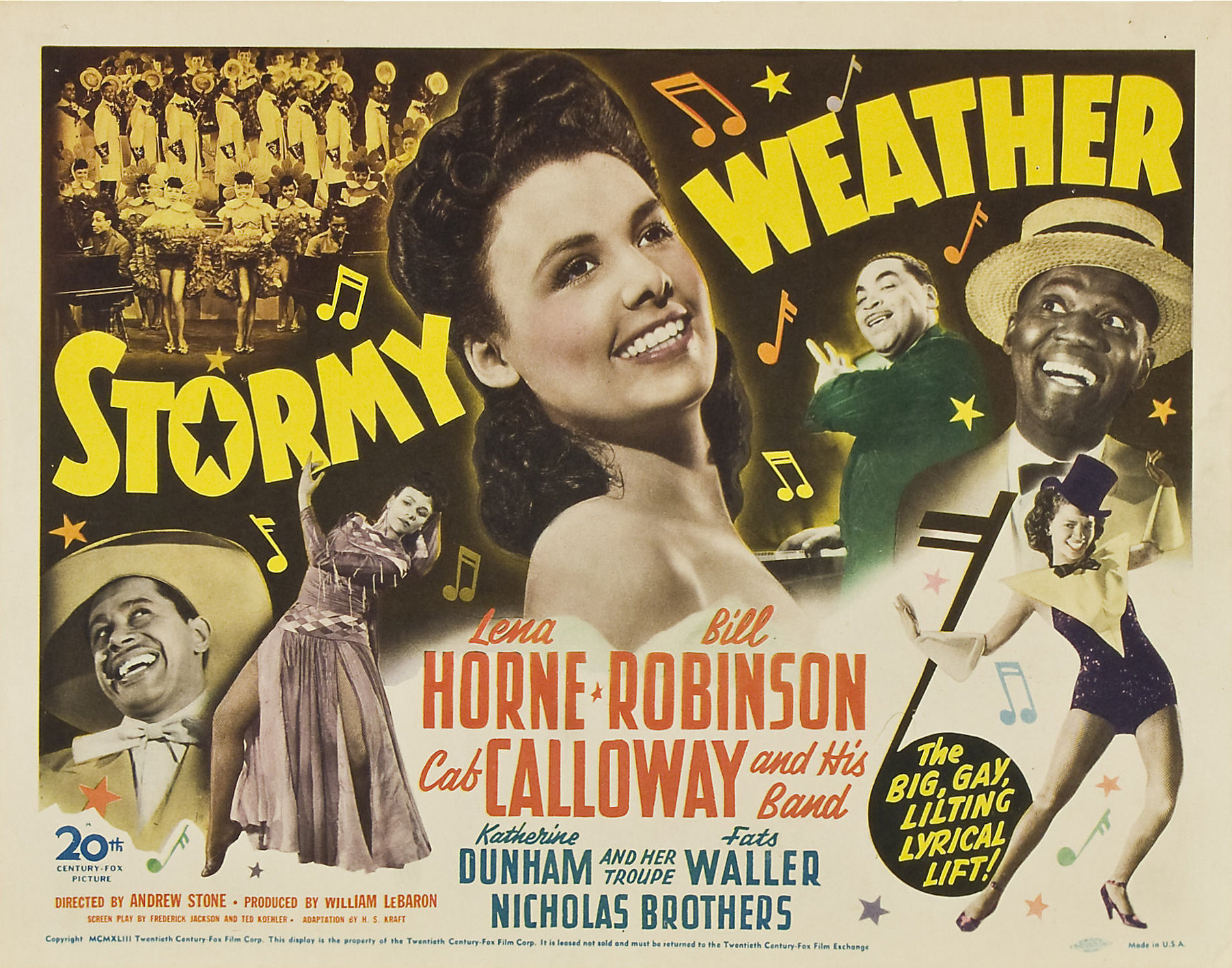
Title card for the American release of the 1943 musical film Stormy Weather.

After the national tour of Cabin in the Sky, the Dunham company stayed in Los Angeles, where they appeared in the Warner Brothers short film Carnival of Rhythm (1941). The next year, after the US entered World War II, Dunham appeared in the Paramount musical film Star Spangled Rhythm (1942) in a specialty number, "Sharp as a Tack," with Eddie "Rochester" Anderson. Other movies she performed in as a dancer during this period included the Abbott and Costello comedy Pardon My Sarong (1942) and the black musical Stormy Weather (1943), which featured a stellar range of actors, musicians and dancers.

The company returned to New York. The company was located on the property that formerly belonged to the Isadora Duncan Dance in Caravan Hill but subsequently moved to W 43rd Street. In September 1943, under the management of the impresario Sol Hurok, her troupe opened in Tropical Review at the Martin Beck Theater. Featuring lively Latin American and Caribbean dances, plantation dances, and American social dances, the show was an immediate success. The original two-week engagement was extended by popular demand into a three-month run, after which the company embarked on an extensive tour of the United States and Canada. In Boston, then a bastion of conservatism, the show was banned in 1944 after only one performance. Although it was well received by the audience, local censors feared that the revealing costumes and provocative dances might compromise public morals. After the tour, in 1945, the Dunham company appeared in the short-lived Blue Holiday at the Belasco Theater in New York, and in the more successful Carib Song at the Adelphi Theatre. The finale to the first act of this show was Shango, a staged interpretation of a Vodun ritual, which became a permanent part of the company's repertory.

In 1946, Dunham returned to Broadway for a revue entitled Bal Nègre, which received glowing notices from theater and dance critics. Early in 1947 Dunham choreographed the musical play Windy City, which premiered at the Great Northern Theater in Chicago. Later in the year she opened a cabaret show in Las Vegas, during the first year that the city became a popular entertainment as well as gambling destination. Later that year she took her troupe to Mexico, where their performances were so popular that they stayed and performed for more than two months. After Mexico, Dunham began touring in Europe, where she was an immediate sensation. In 1948, she opened A Caribbean Rhapsody, first at the Prince of Wales Theatre in London, and then took it to the Théâtre des Champs-Élysées in Paris and the Corso Theater in Zurich.

The company cased a sensation in Europe, and this was the beginning of more than 20 years during which Dunham performed with her company almost exclusively outside the United States. During these years, the Dunham company appeared in some 33 countries in Europe, North Africa, South America, Australia, and East Asia. Dunham continued to develop dozens of new productions during this period, and the company met with enthusiastic audiences in every city. Despite these successes, the company frequently ran into periods of financial difficulties, as Dunham was required to support all of the 30 to 40 dancers and musicians. Richard Buckle's memoir The Adventures of a Ballet Critic (Cresset Press, 1953) contains extended descriptions of his association with Dunham and John Pratt during her company's residency in London in 1948 with A Caribbean Rhapsody, and Buckle's collaboration with Dunham on a book about her work (Katherine Dunham: Her dancers, singers and musicians (Ballet Productions, 1949). This book was printed but never on sale due to Buckle's financial problems; the British Library holds a copy.

Dunham and her company appeared in the Hollywood movie Casbah (1948) with Tony Martin, Yvonne De Carlo, and Peter Lorre, and in the Italian film Botta e Risposta, produced by Dino de Laurentiis. Also that year they appeared in the first ever, hour-long American spectacular televised by NBC, when television was first beginning to spread across America. This was followed by television spectaculars filmed in London, Buenos Aires, Toronto, Sydney, and Mexico City.

In 1950, Sol Hurok presented Katherine Dunham and Her Company in a dance revue at the Broadway Theater in New York, with a program composed of some of Dunham's best works. It closed after only 38 performances. The company soon embarked on a tour of venues in South America, Europe, and North Africa. They had particular success in Denmark and France. In the mid-1950s, Dunham and her company appeared in three films: Mambo (1954), made in Italy; Die Grosse Starparade (1954), made in Germany; and Música en la Noche (1955), made in Mexico City.

=== Later career ===
The Dunham company's international tours ended in Vienna in 1960. They were stranded without money because of bad management by their impresario. Dunham saved the day by arranging for the company to be paid to appear in a German television special, Karibische Rhythmen, after which they returned to the United States. Dunham's last appearance on Broadway was in 1962 in Bamboche!, which included a few former Dunham dancers in the cast and a contingent of dancers and drummers from the Royal Troupe of Morocco. It was not a success, closing after only eight performances.

A highlight of Dunham's later career was the invitation from New York's Metropolitan Opera to stage dances for a new production of Aida, starring soprano Leontyne Price. In 1963, she became the first African American to choreograph for the Met since Hemsley Winfield set the dances for The Emperor Jones in 1933. The critics acknowledged the historical research she did on dance in ancient Egypt, but they were not appreciative of her choreography as staged for this production.

Subsequently, Dunham undertook various choreographic commissions at several venues in the United States and in Europe. In 1966, she served as a State Department representative for the United States to the first ever World Festival of Negro Arts in Dakar, Senegal. In 1967 she officially retired, after presenting a final show at the famous Apollo Theater in Harlem, New York. Even in retirement Dunham continued to choreograph: one of her major works was directing the premiere full, posthumous production Scott Joplin's opera Treemonisha in 1972, a joint production of the Atlanta Symphony Orchestra and the Morehouse College chorus in Atlanta, conducted by Robert Shaw. This work was never produced in Joplin's lifetime, but since the 1970s, it has been successfully produced in many venues.

In 1978 Dunham was featured in the PBS special, Divine Drumbeats: Katherine Dunham and Her People, narrated by James Earl Jones, as part of the Dance in America series. Alvin Ailey later produced a tribute for her in 1987–88 at Carnegie Hall with his American Dance Theater, entitled The Magic of Katherine Dunham.

== Educator and writer ==
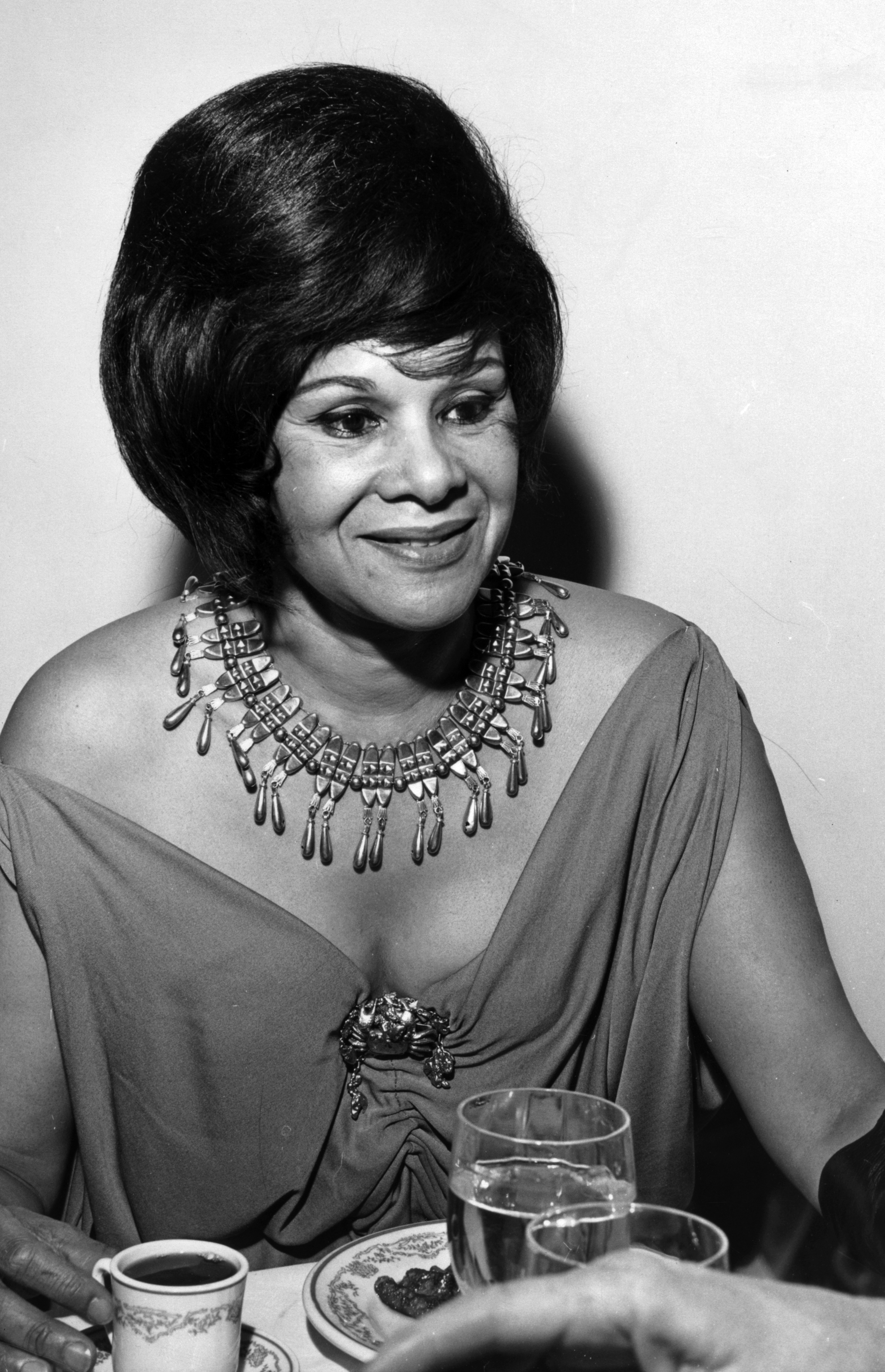
Katherine Dunham 1963

Dunham established her first New York school in January 1944 in partnership with Franziska Boas. Located at 323 West 21st Street, the school reflected the women's shared interests in anthropology and dance education. Their partnership ended within a year amid disagreements over the school's management and teaching methods. Dunham subsequently sought an independent location for her institution.

In January 1945, while on tour, Dunham announced that she had purchased a $200,000 mansion at 14 East 71st Street on Manhattan's Upper East Side, which she intended to use as her residence and the site of her dance school. The purchase challenged racial barriers in one of the city's wealthiest neighborhoods. Although ultimately she did not secure the mansion, the controversy brought national attention to housing discrimination. During the dispute, Mrs. Herbert Lehman solicited Dunham's sponsorship of an interracial community center in the Bronx; Dunham agreed, praising the initiative as evidence of "magnificent inter-racial understanding."

In 1945, Dunham leased space at 220 West 43rd Street in Manhattan's theater district. The premises was renovated to accommodate dance instruction and opened as the Katherine Dunham School of Dance in September. The school was interracial in both its staff and student body.

In 1946, Dunham had changed the school's name to the Dunham School of Dance and Theatre. The school's program included courses in dance, drama, performing arts, applied skills, humanities, cultural studies, and Caribbean research. The school was managed in Dunham's absence by Syvilla Fort, one of her dancers, and thrived for about 10 years. It was considered one of the best learning centers of its type at the time. Schools inspired by it were later opened in Stockholm, Paris, and Rome by dancers who had been trained by Dunham.

Her alumni included many future celebrities, such as Eartha Kitt. As a teenager, she won a scholarship to the Dunham school and later became a dancer with the company, before beginning her successful singing career. Dunham and Kitt collaborated again in the 1970s in an Equity Production of the musical Peg, based on the Irish play, Peg O' My Heart. Dunham Company member Dana McBroom-Manno was selected as a featured artist in the show, which played on the Music Fair Circuit.

Others who attended her school included James Dean, Gregory Peck, Jose Ferrer, Jennifer Jones, Shelley Winters, Sidney Poitier, Shirley MacLaine and Warren Beatty. Marlon Brando frequently dropped in to play the bongo drums, and jazz musician Charles Mingus held regular jam sessions with the drummers. Known for her many innovations, Dunham developed a dance pedagogy, later named the Dunham Technique, a style of movement and exercises based in traditional African dances, to support her choreography. This won international acclaim and is now taught as a modern dance style in many dance schools.

By 1957, Dunham was under severe personal strain, which was affecting her health. She decided to live for a year in relative isolation in Kyoto, Japan, where she worked on writing memoirs of her youth. The first work, entitled A Touch of Innocence: Memoirs of Childhood, was published in 1959. A continuation based on her experiences in Haiti, Island Possessed, was published in 1969. A fictional work based on her African experiences, Kasamance: A Fantasy, was published in 1974. Throughout her career, Dunham occasionally published articles about her anthropological research (sometimes under the pseudonym of Kaye Dunn) and sometimes lectured on anthropological topics at universities and scholarly societies.

In 2012, the Cultural Front online notebook listed some of Dunham's books and short stories, including her 1964 contribution to Ellery Queen's Mystery Magazine "The Crime of Pablo Martínez".

In 1963 Dunham was commissioned to choreograph Aida at New York's Metropolitan Opera Company, with Leontyne Price in the title role. Members of Dunham's last New York Company auditioned to become members of the Met Ballet Company. Among her dancers selected were Marcia McBroom, Dana McBroom, Jean Kelly, and Jesse Oliver. The Met Ballet Company dancers studied Dunham Technique at Dunham's 42nd Street dance studio for the entire summer leading up to the season opening of Aida. Lyndon B. Johnson was in the audience for opening night. Dunham's background as an anthropologist gave the dances of the opera a new authenticity. She was also consulted on costuming for the Egyptian and Ethiopian dress. Dana McBroom-Manno still teaches Dunham Technique in New York City and is a Master of Dunham Technique.

In 1964, Dunham settled in East St. Louis, and took up the post of artist-in-residence at Southern Illinois University in nearby Edwardsville. There she was able to bring anthropologists, sociologists, educational specialists, scientists, writers, musicians, and theater people together to create a liberal arts curriculum that would be a foundation for further college work. One of her fellow professors, with whom she collaborated, was architect Buckminster Fuller.

The following year, 1965, President Lyndon B. Johnson nominated Dunham to be technical cultural adviser—a sort of cultural ambassador—to the government of Senegal in West Africa. Her mission was to help train the Senegalese National Ballet and to assist President Leopold Senghor with arrangements for the First Pan-African World Festival of Negro Arts in Dakar (1965–66). Later Dunham established a second home in Senegal, and she occasionally returned there to scout for talented African musicians and dancers.

In 1967, Dunham opened the Performing Arts Training Center (PATC) in East St. Louis in an effort to use the arts to combat poverty and urban unrest. The restructuring of heavy industry had caused the loss of many working-class jobs, and unemployment was high in the city. After the 1968 riots following the assassination of Martin Luther King Jr., Dunham encouraged gang members in the ghetto to come to the center to use drumming and dance to vent their frustrations. The PATC teaching staff was made up of former members of Dunham's touring company, as well as local residents. While trying to help the young people in the community, Dunham was arrested. This gained international headlines and the embarrassed local police officials quickly released her. She also continued refining and teaching the Dunham Technique to transmit that knowledge to succeeding generations of dance students. She lectured every summer until her death at annual Masters' Seminars in St. Louis, which attracted dance students from around the world. She established the Katherine Dunham Centers for Arts and Humanities in East St. Louis to preserve Haitian and African instruments and artifacts from her personal collection.

In 1976, Dunham was guest artist-in-residence and lecturer for Afro-American studies at the University of California, Berkeley. A photographic exhibit honoring her achievements, entitled Kaiso! Katherine Dunham, was mounted at the Women's Center on the campus. In 1978, an anthology of writings by and about her, also entitled Kaiso! Katherine Dunham, was published in a limited, numbered edition of 130 copies by the Institute for the Study of Social Change.

=== Dunham Technique ===
Dunham technique is a codified dance training technique developed by Katherine Dunham in the mid 20th century. Commonly grouped into the realm of modern dance techniques, Dunham is a technical dance form developed from elements of indigenous African and Afro-Caribbean dances. Strongly founded in her anthropological research in the Caribbean, Dunham technique introduces rhythm as the backbone of various widely known modern dance principles including contraction and release, groundedness, fall and recover, counterbalance, and many more. Using some ballet vernacular, Dunham incorporates these principles into a set of class exercises she labeled as "processions". Each procession builds on the last and focuses on conditioning the body to prepare for specific exercises that come later. Video footage of Dunham technique classes show a strong emphasis on anatomical alignment, breath, and fluidity. Dancers are frequently instructed to place weight on the balls of their feet, lengthen their lumbar and cervical spines, and breathe from the abdomen and not the chest. There is also a strong emphasis on training dancers in the practices of engaging with polyrhythms by simultaneously moving their upper and lower bodies according to different rhythmic patterns. These exercises prepare the dancers for African social and spiritual dances that are practiced later in the class including the Mahi, Yonvalou, and Congo Paillette.

According to Dunham, the development of her technique came out of a need for specialized dancers to support her choreographic visions and a greater yearning for technique that "said the things that [she] wanted to say." Dunham explains that while she admired the narrative quality of ballet technique, she wanted to develop a movement vocabulary that captured the essence of the Afro-Caribbean dancers she worked with during her travels. In a different interview, Dunham describes her technique "as a way of life," a sentiment that seems to be shared by many of her admiring students. Many of Dunham students who attended free public classes in East St. Louis Illinois speak highly about the influence of her open technique classes and artistic presence in the city. Her classes are described as a safe haven for many and some of her students even attribute their success in life to the structure and artistry of her technical institution. Dunham technique is also inviting to the influence of cultural movement languages outside of dance including karate and capoeira.

Dunham is still taught at widely recognized dance institutions such as The American Dance Festival and The Ailey School.

== Social activism ==
The Katherine Dunham Company toured throughout North America in the mid-1940s, performing as well in the racially segregated South. Dunham refused to hold a show in one theater after finding out that the city's black residents had not been allowed to buy tickets for the performance. On another occasion, in October 1944, after getting a rousing standing ovation in Louisville, Kentucky, she told the all-white audience that she and her company would not return because "your management will not allow people like you to sit next to people like us." She expressed a hope that time and the "war for tolerance and democracy" (this was during World War II) would bring a change. One historian noted that "during the course of the tour, Dunham and the troupe had recurrent problems with racial discrimination, leading her to a posture of militancy which was to characterize her subsequent career."

In Hollywood, Dunham refused to sign a lucrative studio contract when the producer said she would have to replace some of her darker-skinned company members. She and her company frequently had difficulties finding adequate accommodations while on tour because in many regions of the country, black Americans were not allowed to stay at hotels.

While Dunham was recognized as "unofficially" representing American cultural life in her foreign tours, she was given very little assistance of any kind by the U.S. State Department. She had incurred the displeasure of departmental officials when her company performed Southland, a ballet that dramatized the lynching of a black man in the racist American South. Its premiere performance on December 9, 1950, at the Teatro Municipal in Santiago, Chile, generated considerable public interest in the early months of 1951. The State Department was dismayed by the negative view of American society that the ballet presented to foreign audiences. As a result, Dunham would later experience some diplomatic "difficulties" on her tours. The State Department regularly subsidized other less well-known groups, but it consistently refused to support her company (even when it was entertaining U.S. Army troops), although at the same time it did not hesitate to take credit for them as "unofficial artistic and cultural representatives".

=== The Afonso Arinos Law in Brazil ===
In 1950, while visiting Brazil, Dunham and her group were refused rooms at a first-class hotel in São Paulo, the Hotel Esplanada, frequented by many American businessmen. Understanding that the fact was due to racial discrimination, she made sure the incident was publicized. The incident was widely discussed in the Brazilian press and became a hot political issue. In response, the Afonso Arinos law was passed in 1951 that made racial discrimination in public places a felony in Brazil.

=== Hunger strike ===
In 1992, at age 83, Dunham went on a highly publicized hunger strike to protest the discriminatory U.S. foreign policy against Haitian boat-people. Time reported that, "she went on a 47-day hunger strike to protest the U.S.'s forced repatriation of Haitian refugees. "My job", she said, "is to create a useful legacy." During her protest, Dick Gregory led a non-stop vigil at her home, where many disparate personalities came to show their respect, such as Debbie Allen, Jonathan Demme, and Louis Farrakhan, leader of the Nation of Islam.

This initiative drew international publicity to the plight of the Haitian boat-people and U.S. discrimination against them. Dunham ended her fast only after exiled Haitian president Jean-Bertrand Aristide and Jesse Jackson came to her and personally requested that she stop risking her life for this cause. In recognition of her stance, President Aristide later awarded her a medal of Haiti's highest honor.

== Personal life ==
Dunham married Jordis McCoo, a black postal worker, in 1931, but he did not share her interests and they gradually drifted apart, finally divorcing in 1938. About that time Dunham met and began to work with John Thomas Pratt, a Canadian who had become one of America's most renowned costume and theatrical set designers. Pratt, who was white, shared Dunham's interests in African-Caribbean cultures and was happy to put his talents in her service. After he became her artistic collaborator, they became romantically involved. In the summer of 1941, after the national tour of Cabin in the Sky ended, they went to Mexico, where interracial marriages were less controversial than in the United States, and engaged in a commitment ceremony on 20 July, which thereafter they gave as the date of their wedding. In fact, that ceremony was not recognized as a legal marriage in the United States, a point of law that would come to trouble them some years later. Katherine Dunham and John Pratt married in 1949 to adopt Marie-Christine, a French 14-month-old baby. From the beginning of their association, around 1938, Pratt designed the sets and every costume Dunham ever wore. He continued as her artistic collaborator until his death in 1986.

When she was not performing, Dunham and Pratt often visited Haiti for extended stays. On one of these visits, during the late 1940s, she purchased a large property of more than seven hectares (approximately 17.3 acres) in the Carrefours suburban area of Port-au-Prince, known as Habitation Leclerc. Dunham used Habitation Leclerc as a private retreat for many years, frequently bringing members of her dance company to recuperate from the stress of touring and to work on developing new dance productions. After running it as a tourist spot, with Vodun dancing as entertainment, in the early 1960s, she sold it to a French entrepreneur in the early 1970s.

In 1949, Dunham returned from international touring with her company for a brief stay in the United States, where she suffered a temporary nervous breakdown after the premature death of her beloved brother Albert. He had been a promising philosophy professor at Howard University and a protégé of Alfred North Whitehead. During this time, she developed a warm friendship with the psychologist and philosopher Erich Fromm, whom she had known in Europe. He was only one of a number of international celebrities who were Dunham's friends. In December 1951, a photo of Dunham dancing with Ismaili Muslim leader Prince Ali Khan at a private party he had hosted for her in Paris appeared in a popular magazine and fueled rumors that the two were romantically linked. Both Dunham and the prince denied the suggestion. The prince was then married to actress Rita Hayworth, and Dunham was now legally married to John Pratt; a quiet ceremony in Las Vegas had taken place earlier in the year. The couple had officially adopted their foster daughter, a 14-month-old girl they had found as an infant in a Catholic convent nursery in Fresnes, France. Named Marie-Christine Dunham Pratt, she was their only child.

Among Dunham's closest friends and colleagues was Julie Robinson, formerly a performer with the Katherine Dunham Company, and her husband, singer and later political activist Harry Belafonte. Both remained close friends of Dunham for many years, until her death. Dr. Glory Van Scott and Jean-Léon Destiné were among other former Dunham dancers who remained her lifelong friends.

== British Newspaper Archive blog ==
In 2023, The British Newspaper Archive published a blog entitled "Exploring the ‘Dancing Anthropologist’ Katherine Dunham’s Visits to the UK". The blog focussed on Dunham's experiences in the United Kingdom, starting with the first reviews of a show in 1948; this was "A Caribbean Rhapsody". The review in "The Stage" stated "She is a capable artist and her dancing, miming, and singing are excellent." It continued by noting that Dunham displayed "a delightful sense of humour and joie de vivre."

The blog continued with a photograph of one of her dances from the show, which appeared in "The Sketch" in July 1948. The next item in the aforementioned blog was about a lecture she gave at for Royal Anthropological Institute in University College. Her topic was "the occurrence of cults among peoples whose connection with their traditional culture has been lost.’".

The blog continues with much more about her UK visit. For example, the Belfast News-Letter highlighted her other talents, including the writing of short stories. The Dalkeith Advertiser described Dunham as" a star performer, anthropologist, choreographer, director, producer, author, essayist, and the world of theatre has been made richer by the great art of this remarkable woman."

== Death ==
On May 21, 2006, Dunham died in her sleep from natural causes in Manhattan New York. She died at age 96 in her home. Her death was confirmed by former Dunham dancer and friend, Dr. Glory Van Scott. She is survived by her daughter, Marie-Christine Dunham-Pratt who lives in Rome and works to maintain her mother's legacy.

== Legacy ==
=== Anthropology ===
Katherine Dunham predated, pioneered, and demonstrated new ways of doing and envisioning Anthropology six decades ahead of the discipline.

In the 1970s, scholars of Anthropology such as Dell Hymes and William S. Willis began to discuss Anthropology's participation in scientific colonialism. This wave continued throughout the 1990s with scholars publishing works (such as Decolonizing Anthropology: Moving Further in Anthropology for Liberation, Decolonizing Methodologies, and more recently, The Case for Letting Anthropology Burn) that critique anthropology and the discipline's roles in colonial knowledge production and power structures. Much of the literature calls upon researchers to go beyond bureaucratic protocols to protect communities from harm, but rather use their research to benefit communities that they work with.

Six decades before this new wave of anthropological discourse began, Katherine Dunham's work demonstrated anthropology being used as a force for challenging racist and colonial ideologies. After recovering crucial dance epistemologies relevant to people of the African diaspora during her ethnographic research, she applied anthropological knowledge toward developing her own dance pedagogy (Dunham Technique) that worked to reconcile with the legacy of colonization and racism and correct sociocultural injustices. Her dance education, while offering cultural resources for dealing with the consequences and realities of living in a racist environment, also brought about feelings of hope and dignity for inspiring her students to contribute positively to their own communities, and spreading essential cultural and spiritual capital within the U.S.

Just like her colleague Zora Neale Hurston, Dunham's anthropology inspired the blurring of lines between creative disciplines and anthropology. Early on into graduate school, Dunham was forced to choose between finishing her master's degree in anthropology and pursuing her career in dance. She describes this during an interview in 2002: "My problem—my strong drive at that time was to remain in this academic position that anthropology gave me, and at the same time continue with this strong drive for motion—rhythmic motion". She ultimately chose to continue her career in dance without her master's degree in anthropology. A key reason for this choice was because she knew that through dance, her work would be able to be accessed by a wider array of audiences; more so than if she continued to limit her work within academia.

However, this decision did not keep her from engaging with and highly influencing the discipline for the rest of her life and beyond. As one of her biographers, Joyce Aschenbrenner, wrote: "anthropology became a life-way" for Dunham. Her choreography and performances made use of a concept within Dance Anthropology called "research-to-performance". Most of Dunham's works previewed many questions essential to anthropology's postmodern turn, such as critiquing understandings of modernity, interpretation, ethnocentrism, and cultural relativism. During this time, in addition to Dunham, numerous Black women such as Zora Neal Hurston, Caroline Bond Day, Irene Diggs, and Erna Brodber were also working to transform the discipline into an anthropology of liberation: employing critical and creative cultural production.

Numerous scholars describe Dunham as pivotal to the fields of Dance Education, Applied Anthropology, Humanistic Anthropology, African Diasporic Anthropology and Liberatory Anthropology. Additionally, she was named one of the most influential African American anthropologists. She was a pioneer of Dance Anthropology, established methodologies of ethnochoreology, and her work gives essential historical context to current conversations and practices of decolonization within and outside of the discipline of anthropology. Her legacy within Anthropology and Dance Anthropology continues to shine with each new day.

=== Dance ===
Anna Kisselgoff, a dance critic for The New York Times, called Dunham "a major pioneer in Black theatrical dance ... ahead of her time." "In introducing authentic African dance-movements to her company and audiences, Dunham—perhaps more than any other choreographer of the time—exploded the possibilities of modern dance expression."

As one of her biographers, Joyce Aschenbrenner, wrote: "Today, it is safe to say, there is no American black dancer who has not been influenced by the Dunham Technique, unless he or she works entirely within a classical genre", and the Dunham Technique is still taught to anyone who studies modern dance.

The highly respected Dance magazine did a feature cover story on Dunham in August 2000 entitled "One-Woman Revolution". As Wendy Perron wrote, "Jazz dance, 'fusion,' and the search for our cultural identity all have their antecedents in Dunham's work as a dancer, choreographer, and anthropologist. She was the first American dancer to present indigenous forms on a concert stage, the first to sustain a black dance company.... She created and performed in works for stage, clubs, and Hollywood films; she started a school and a technique that continue to flourish; she fought unstintingly for racial justice."

Scholar of the arts Harold Cruse wrote in 1964: "Her early and lifelong search for meaning and artistic values for black people, as well as for all peoples, has motivated, created opportunities for, and launched careers for generations of young black artists ... Afro-American dance was usually in the avant-garde of modern dance ... Dunham's entire career spans the period of the emergence of Afro-American dance as a serious art."

Black writer Arthur Todd described her as "one of our national treasures". Regarding her impact and effect he wrote: "The rise of American Negro dance commenced ... when Katherine Dunham and her company skyrocketed into the Windsor Theater in New York, from Chicago in 1940, and made an indelible stamp on the dance world... Miss Dunham opened the doors that made possible the rapid upswing of this dance for the present generation." "What Dunham gave modern dance was a coherent lexicon of African and Caribbean styles of movement—a flexible torso and spine, articulated pelvis and isolation of the limbs, a polyrhythmic strategy of moving—which she integrated with techniques of ballet and modern dance." "Her mastery of body movement was considered 'phenomenal.' She was hailed for her smooth and fluent choreography and dominated a stage with what has been described as 'an unmitigating radiant force providing beauty with a feminine touch full of variety and nuance."

Richard Buckle, ballet historian and critic, wrote: "Her company of magnificent dancers and musicians ... met with the success it has and that herself as explorer, thinker, inventor, organizer, and dancer should have reached a place in the estimation of the world, has done more than a million pamphlets could for the service of her people."

"Dunham's European success led to considerable imitation of her work in European revues ... it is safe to say that the perspectives of concert-theatrical dance in Europe were profoundly affected by the performances of the Dunham troupe."

While in Europe, she also influenced hat styles on the continent as well as spring fashion collections, featuring the Dunham line and Caribbean Rhapsody, and the Chiroteque Française made a bronze cast of her feet for a museum of important personalities."

The Katherine Dunham Company became an incubator for many well known performers, including Archie Savage, Talley Beatty, Janet Collins, Lenwood Morris, Vanoye Aikens, Lucille Ellis, Pearl Reynolds, Camille Yarbrough, Lavinia Williams, and Tommy Gomez.

Alvin Ailey, who stated that he first became interested in dance as a professional career after having seen a performance of the Katherine Dunham Company as a young teenager of 14 in Los Angeles, called the Dunham Technique "the closest thing to a unified Afro-American dance existing."

For several years, Dunham's personal assistant and press promoter was Maya Deren, who later also became interested in Vodun and wrote The Divine Horseman: The Voodoo Gods of Haiti (1953). Deren is now considered to be a pioneer of independent American filmmaking. Dunham herself was quietly involved in both the Voodoo and Orisa communities of the Caribbean and the United States, in particular with the Lucumi tradition.

Not only did Dunham shed light on the cultural value of black dance, but she clearly contributed to changing perceptions of blacks in America by showing society that as a black woman, she could be an intelligent scholar, a beautiful dancer, and a skilled choreographer. As Julia Foulkes pointed out, "Dunham's path to success lay in making high art in the United States from African and Caribbean sources, capitalizing on a heritage of dance within the African Diaspora, and raising perceptions of African American capabilities."

== Awards and honors ==
Over the years Katherine Dunham has received scores of special awards, including more than a dozen honorary doctorates from various American universities.

- In 1971 she received the Heritage Award from the National Dance Association.
- In 1979 at Carnegie Hall, she received the Albert Schweitzer Music Award "for a life's work dedicated to music and devoted to humanity."
- In 1983 she was a recipient of one of the highest artistic awards in the United States, the Kennedy Center Honors.
- In 1986 the American Anthropological Association gave her a Distinguished Service Award.
- In 1987 she received the Samuel H. Scripps American Dance Festival Award, and was also inducted into the National Museum of Dance's Mr. & Mrs. Cornelius Vanderbilt Whitney Hall of Fame in Saratoga Springs, New York. She also received a Candace Award from the National Coalition of 100 Black Women.
- In 1989 she was awarded a National Medal of Arts, an honor shared by only two other University of Chicago alumni, Saul Bellow and Philip Roth.
- Dunham has her own star on the St. Louis Walk of Fame.
- In 2000 she was named one of the first one hundred of "America's Irreplaceable Dance Treasures" by the Dance Heritage Coalition.
- In 2002 Molefi Kete Asante included her in his book 100 Greatest African Americans.
- In 2004 she received a Lifetime Achievement Award from Dance Teacher magazine.
- In 2005, she was awarded "Outstanding Leadership in Dance Research" by the Congress on Research in Dance.

== See also ==
- List of dancers

== Sources ==
- Aschenbrenner, Joyce. Katherine Dunham: Dancing A Life. Urbana and Chicago: University of Illinois Press, 2002. ISBN 0-252-02759-0
- Chin, Elizabeth. "Katherine Dunham's Dance as Public Anthropology." ..American Anthropologist.. 112, no. 4 (December 2010): 640–642. Katherine Dunham's Dance as Public Anthropology.
- Chin, Elizabeth. Katherine Dunham: Recovering an Anthropological Legacy, Choreographing Ethnographic Futures. Advanced Seminar Series. Santa Fe, NM: School for Advanced research Press, 2014. Biography
- Cruz Banks, Ojeya. "Katherine Dunham: Decolonizing Anthropology Through African American Dance Pedagogy." Transforming Anthropology 20 (2012): 159–168.
- Dunham, Katherine. A Touch of Innocence. Chicago: University of Chicago Press, 1994.
- Dunham, Katherine. Island Possessed. Chicago: University of Chicago Press, 1994
- Haskins, James, Katherine Dunham. New York: Coward, McCann, & Geoghegan, 1982.
- "Kaiso!: Writings by and About Katherine Dunham."
- Katherine Dunham on dance anthropology. Video. Katherine Dunham on dance anthropology.
- Katherine Dunham on her anthropological films. Video. Katherine Dunham on her anthropological films
- Kraut, Anthea, "Between Primitivism and Diaspora: The Dance Performances of Josephine Baker, Zora Neale Hurston, and Katherine Dunham," Theatre Journal 55 (2003): 433–450.
- Long, Richard A., The Black Tradition in American Dance. New York: Smithmark Publications, 1995.

== Archives ==
- The Katherine Dunham Collection and the online Katherine Dunham Collection at the Library of Congress.
- Guide to the Photograph Collection on Katherine Dunham. Special Collections and Archives, The UC Irvine Libraries, Irvine, California.
- Dunham Collection – Missouri History Museum
- Katherine Dunham Museum in East St. Louis, Illinois
