= The Emperor Jones (disambiguation) =

The Emperor Jones may refer to:

- The Emperor Jones, a play by Eugene O'Neill
- The Emperor Jones (film), 1933 adaptation directed by Dudley Murphy
- The Emperor Jones (1938 TV play), adaptation produced by the BBC, starring Robert Adams
- The Emperor Jones (1953 TV play), adaptation produced by the BBC, starring Gordon Heath
- "The Emperor Jones" (Kraft Television Theatre), 1955 television play adaptation produced by the Kraft Television Theatre starring Ossie Davis
- The Emperor Jones (opera), a 1933 opera by Louis Gruenberg
