= Jules Bledsoe =

American opera singer (1897–1943)

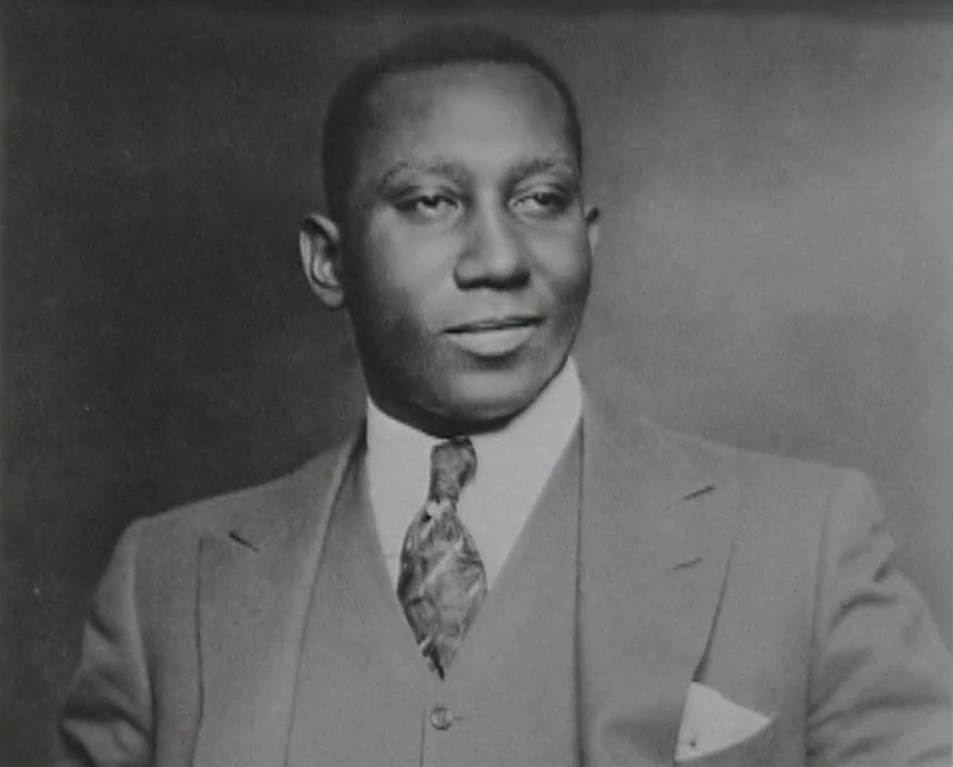
Jules Bledsoe (1897–1943)

Julius Lorenzo Cobb Bledsoe (December 29, 1897 – July 14, 1943) was an American baritone, a leading figure in the Harlem Renaissance, the first major Black opera singer in the United States, and one of the first Black artists to gain regular employment on Broadway.

== Early life and education ==
Jules Bledsoe was born Julius Lorenzo Cobb Bledsoe in Waco, Texas in 1897 or 1898, the only child of Henry L. and Jessie Cobb Bledsoe. When his parents separated in 1899, Julius went with his mother to live with the Cobb family. His grandmother, mother, and aunts taught him to sing and play the piano. His grandfather, Stephen Cobb, in 1866 was the founding pastor of New Hope Baptist Church, the first organized religious congregation for freed slaves in Waco. It was where Bledsoe reportedly sang his first concert at the age of 5. During his youth Bledsoe attended Central Texas Academy from 1905 to 1914. After graduating as valedictorian, he studied liberal arts and music at Bishop College in Marshall, Texas, earning his B.A. magna cum laude in May 1918. (Bishop College also awarded Bledsoe an honorary Doctorate later in his career.) After graduation, he moved to Harper's Ferry, West Virginia, where he served in the Civilian Chaplain Service, worked as a secretary, and promoted musical entertainment for the YMCA. He was also a member of the ROTC at Virginia Union University in Richmond, Virginia. After discharge from ROTC in December 1918, he moved to Brooklyn, New York, working as a freelance musician. In 1920 he began to study medicine at Columbia University but reevaluated his goals after his mother died. He decided to pursue a career as a professional musician instead, and began voice study with Claude Warford. Later he also studied under Lazar Samoiloff, Luigi Parisotti in Rome, and Mme. Bakkers in Paris.

== Career ==
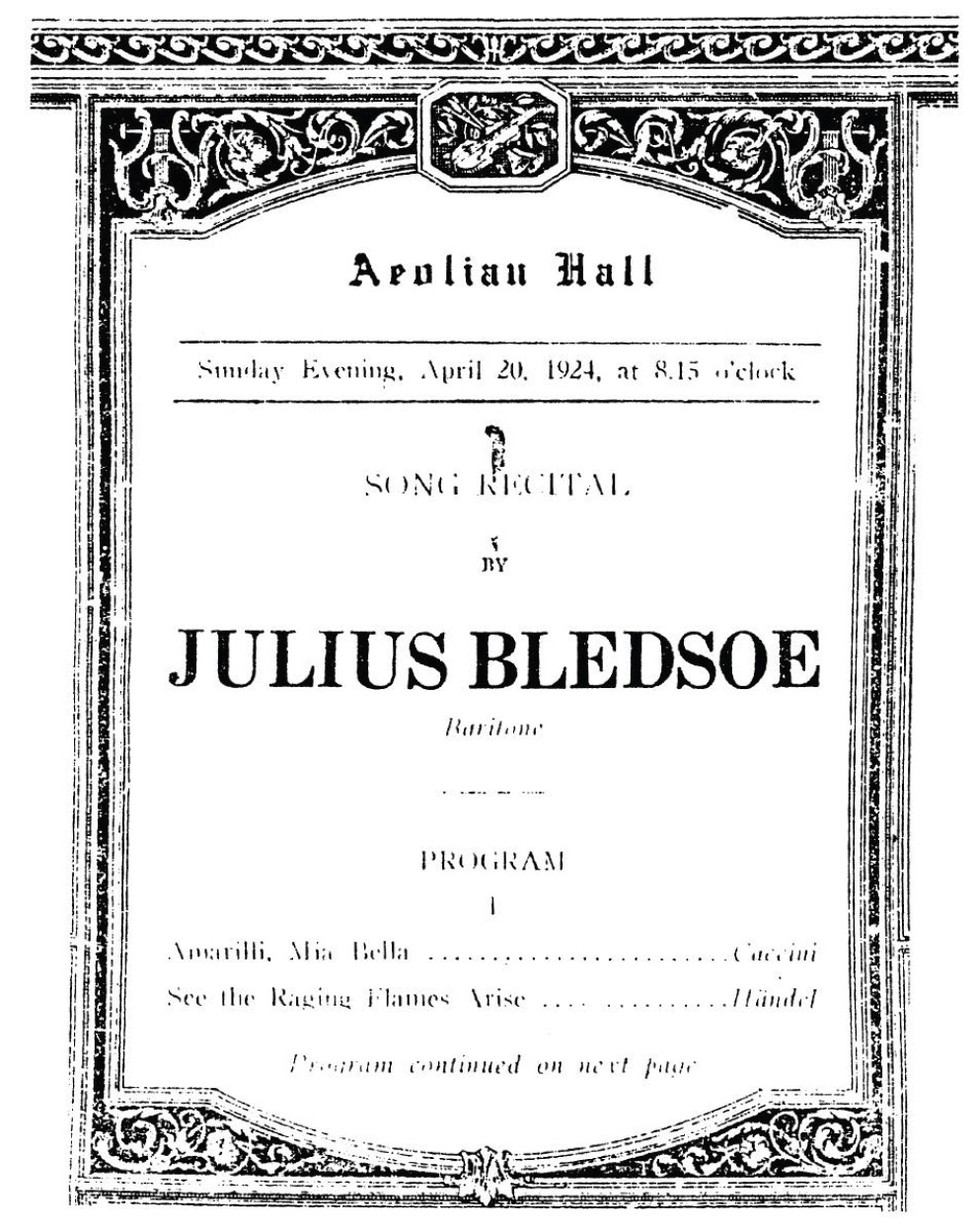
Debut Recital Program, Aeolian Hall, New York City, April 20, 1924.

Opportunities for Black singers, especially Black male singers, were nearly non-existent on the concert or operatic stage in the early 1920s. Most of the few who found any success did so by traveling to Europe to establish a professional career. Bledsoe was an exception. He was able to sign with New York City musical agent and impresario Sol Hurok, who would manage contralto Marian Anderson a decade later. With Hurok's sponsorship, Bledsoe made his professional singing debut in New York's Aeolian Hall on Easter Sunday, April 20, 1924. Over the course of his career he traveled throughout the United States and Europe performing, acting, and writing. In 1927, when he was hired for the musical Show Boat, he announced that he changed his first name from "Julius" to "Jules."

In New York City, early in his career, Bledsoe lived on Sugar Hill in Harlem. His addresses included:

- The Colonial Parkway Apartments at 409 Edgecombe Avenue
- 880 St. Nicholas Avenue
- The Garrison Apartments, 435 Convent Avenue, where in 1929 he was one of this cooperative apartment building's original shareholders and Board members

Later in his career, he lived in East Midtown at 147 East 56th Street.

=== Opera and music ===
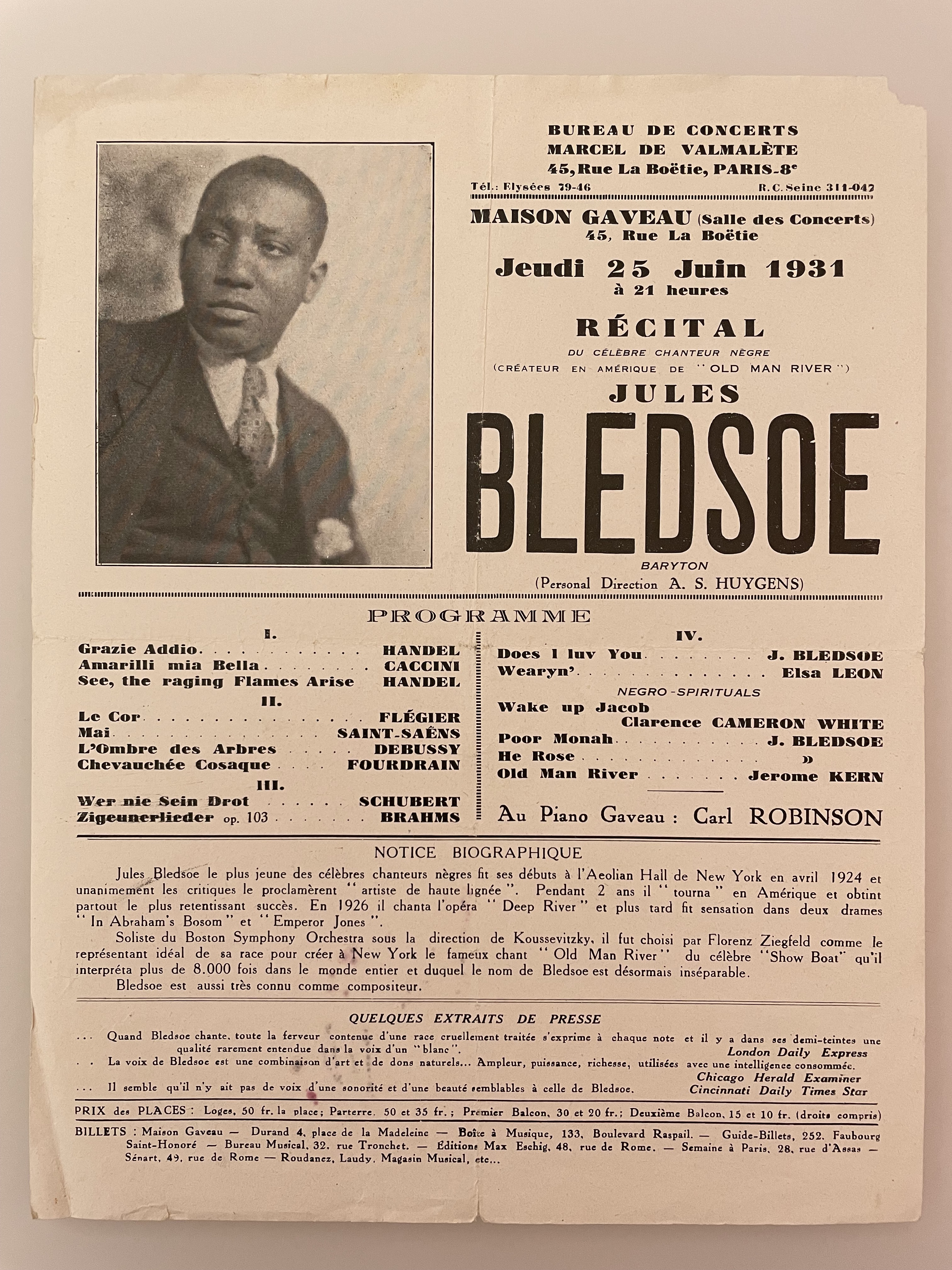
Recital Flyer, Maison Gaveau, Paris, 25 June 1931. Personal Direction, A. S. [sic] Huygens.

Bledsoe performed in many major operas and was in high demand due to his impressive vocal range and his ability to speak and sing in 8 languages: English, French, Italian, German, Russian, Spanish, Yiddish, and Dutch. In 1926 Bledsoe was a soloist at concerts in Boston under the direction of Serge Koussevitsky and also created the role of Tizan in W. Franke Harling and Laurence Stallings's Deep River, a voodoo-themed opera set in 1835 in New Orleans, produced by Arthur Hopkins at the Imperial Theatre. A critic from the New York Morning Telegraph praised Bledsoe as the Deep River star who could “pick the heart right out of anybody.” In 1927, Bledsoe shared the stage with Rose McClendon, Abbie Mitchell, and Frank Wilson in Paul Green’s In Abraham’s Bosom, which won the Pulitzer Prize for Drama in 1927. Bledsoe also performed the title character in Modest Mussorgsky's Boris Godunov.

Bledsoe was the first to perform the role of Joe in Florenz Ziegfeld's 1927 production of Show Boat by Jerome Kern and Oscar Hammerstein II (based on the 1926 novel Show Boat by Edna Ferber). It became Bledsoe's best known role, and his interpretation of "Ol' Man River" made the song a popular American classic. He recreated the role in the part-talkie 1929 film Show Boat. Bledsoe's only recording of "Ol' Man River" is today occasionally played on the NPR musical theatre program, A Night on the Town. His rendition of the song, in comparison to those by Paul Robeson, William Warfield (in the 1951 film version), Bruce Hubbard (on the 1988 three-disc EMI album), and Michel Bell (in the Harold Prince revival of the show), is somewhat melodramatic in the manner of early twentieth-century acting. Bledsoe rolls all his Rs, as a baritone might when singing solos in an oratorio. A 2007 compact disc of vintage American Negro Spirituals includes Bledsoe singing "Swing Low, Sweet Chariot" in that same style, which demonstrates that it was not unique to his performance of "Ol' Man River." Bledsoe was also filmed singing "Ol' Man River" in the sound prologue to the 1929 film Show Boat.

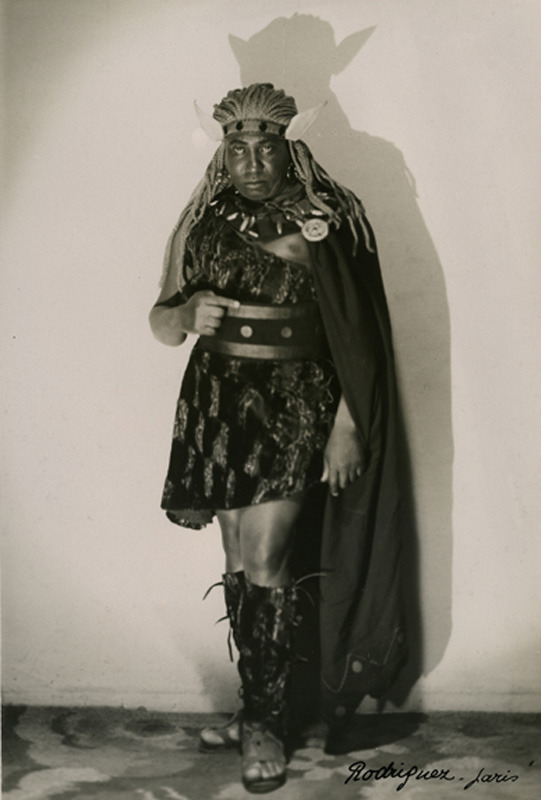
Jules Bledsoe as Amonasro in Verdi's Aida. Paris, 1937.

In 1932, Bledsoe appeared with the Cleveland Stadium Opera Company in its production of Giuseppe Verdi's Aida. He was called up with only 24 hour's notice to replace Mostyn Thomas in the role of the Ethiopian king, Amonasro. It was a performance that crossed the color line for first time in American opera. In 1933, Bledsoe also sang the role of Amonasro with Alfredo Salmaggi's Chicago Opera Company at the New York Hippodrome and with the Royal Dutch-Italian Opera Company in Amsterdam. He reprised the role in November 1934 with the Cosmopolitan Opera Association, also at the New York Hippodrome.

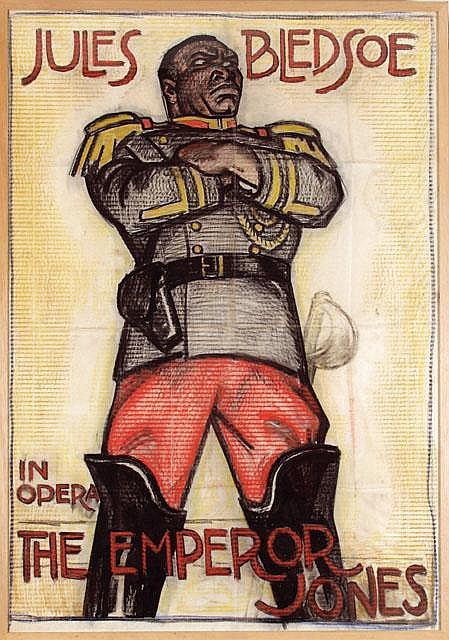
Opera The Emperor Jones, 1934. Poster by Willy Sluiter

In 1930, Bledsoe created an original, more Afro-centric operatic adaptation of Eugene O'Neill's play, The Emperor Jones, from which he excised the word "nigger." He could not secure the opera rights to the play, however; O'Neill had already given them to composer Louis Gruenberg. Literary scholar Katie N. Johnson discovered Bledsoe's operatic scenario for it (retitled L'Empereur Jones in French) concealed in an undated travel journal among his papers in The Texas Collection at Baylor University, as well as nearly 30 pages of his operatic score tucked away and not indexed in a box labeled "Sheet Music" among Bledsoe's papers at the Schomburg Center for Research in Black Culture of the New York Public Library. Johnson notes that "Bledsoe's version was performed, though how often or where is uncertain." In 1934, Gruenberg's adaptation of The Emperor Jones toured abroad, in England and the Netherlands, with Bledsoe starring in the title role. He got rave reviews, and returned to the United States intent on playing the role at home, even if it was Gruenberg's and not his own adaptation. But in the early 1930s nearly all American opera houses were segregated, and when Gruenberg's The Emperor Jones ran in New York at the Metropolitan Opera in 1933-1934, the title role, Brutus Jones, went to the legendary white baritone Lawrence Tibbett, who sang it in blackface. His performance was praised in the white press and panned in the Black press. The role remained Tibbett's. Barred from singing at The Met because of his race, Bledsoe starred instead in an all-Black production of Gruenberg's The Emperor Jones in the summer of 1934 by the all-Black but short-lived Aeolian Opera Company, which staged it just blocks away from The Met at the Mecca Temple (now the New York City Center). It was a history-making show, enthusiastically praised in both the white and Black press. In the winter of 1934, Bledsoe reprised the role with the Cosmopolitan Opera Company at the New York Hippodrome, to excellent reviews.

Bledsoe was also a composer. For voice, violin, and orchestra, he composed a set of four songs called African Suite, which he performed with the BBC Symphony in 1936 and the Royal Concertgebouw Orchestra in Amsterdam in 1937. He also wrote several other songs, including "Does I Luv You," "Poor Monah," "Grandmother's Melodies," "Beside a New-Made Grave," "The Farewell," "Good Old British Blue," and "Ode to America." He set Countee Cullen’s poem “Pagan Prayer” to music and performed it to widespread acclaim. In 1939 he wrote a full opera called Bondage, based on Harriet Beecher Stowe's novel Uncle Tom's Cabin. Most of his composing was done on his farm in the Catskill Mountains, outside Roxbury, New York, which he had purchased in 1929 and named "Jessie's Manna Farm" in honor of his mother.

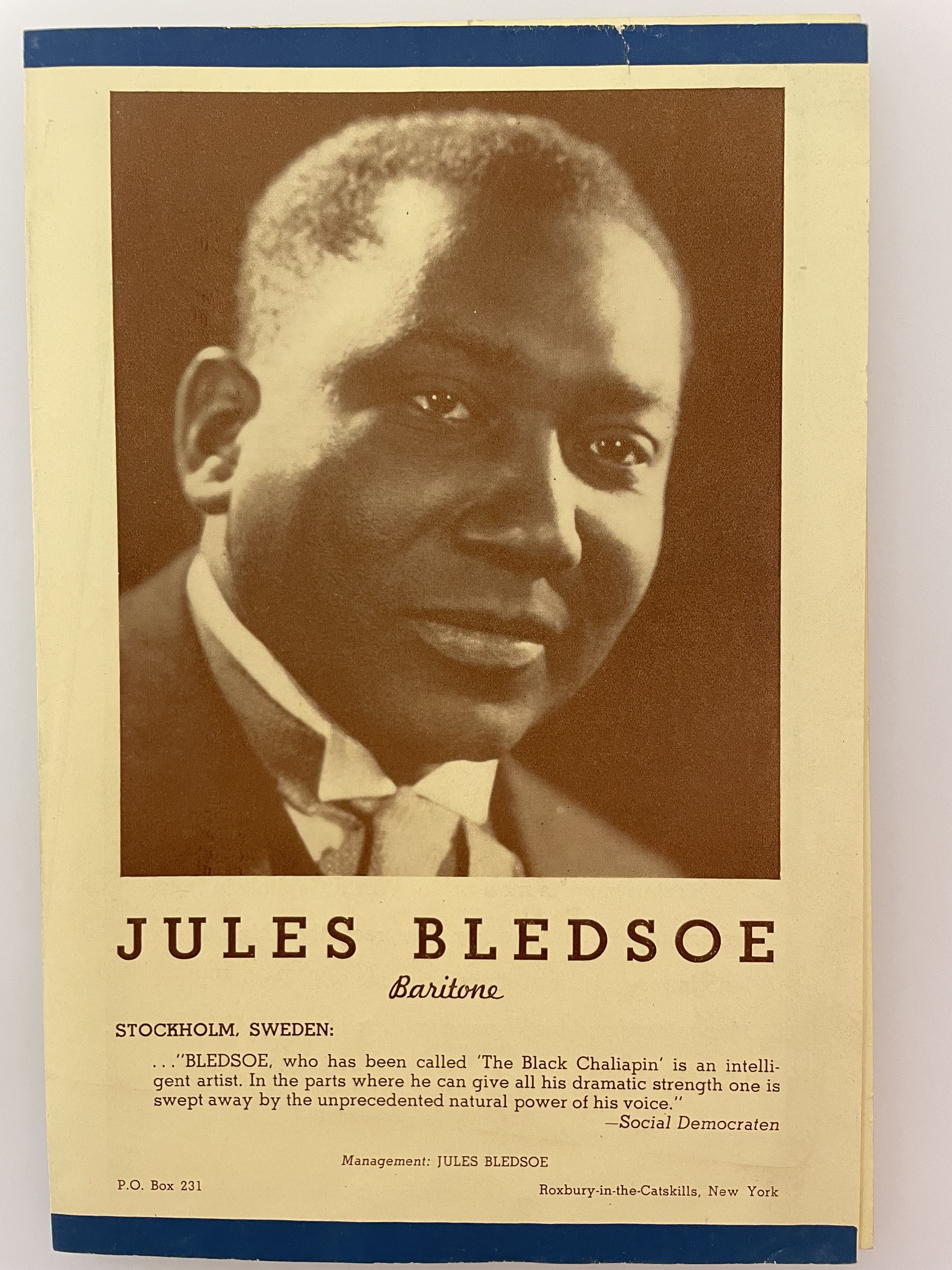
Publicity brochure cover, date unknown

Early in his career, Bledsoe recognized his own role as a Black trailblazer in theatre and music. In 1928 in Opportunity: A Journal of Negro Life, he published an essay titled "Has the Negro a Place in the Theatre?" His conclusion is that "It is up to the few of us that have gotten past the sentinels at the gate, to fling the gates wide open for our successors." Bledsoe believed that Black artistic talent must be proven "by the excellence of the many, rather than that of the few."

=== Film ===
Between 1929 and 1930, Bledsoe appeared in three musical film Shorts: Old Man Trouble, On the Levee, and Dear Old Southland. He spent 1940 and 1941 working in Hollywood, and played the part of Kalu in Drums of the Congo. He is believed to have acted in Safari, Western Union and Santa Fe Trail, although his name did not appear in the credits.

== Personal life ==
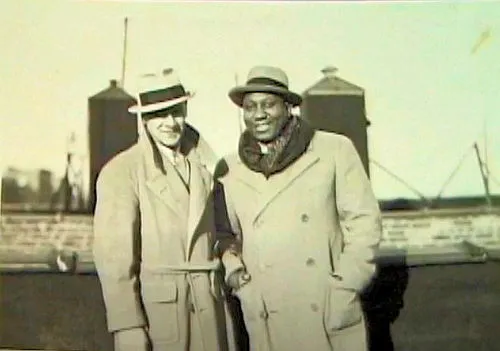
Jules Bledsoe (right) with his life-partner Freddy Huygens

Jules Bledsoe was gay, but during his lifetime his personal life and sexual orientation were not directly acknowledged or discussed in the newspapers and other media. Bledsoe's manager, Adriaan Frederik "Freddy" Huygens, a member of the rich and influential Huygens family of the Netherlands, was also his lover and life-partner. They met in 1931. Huygens was living in London, and a reporter for the Daily Sketch wrote on July 27, 1931:

Bachelor hosts, I have noticed, often give the best parties. The one given by Mr. F. Huygens, who is Dutch, young, very rich and has a lovely house in Lowndes-square, was one of the most successful. There was such a crowd that the late comers sat on the stairs to listen to Jules Bledsoe, the negro singer and creator of “Ole [sic] Man River’ in the American production of Show Boat.

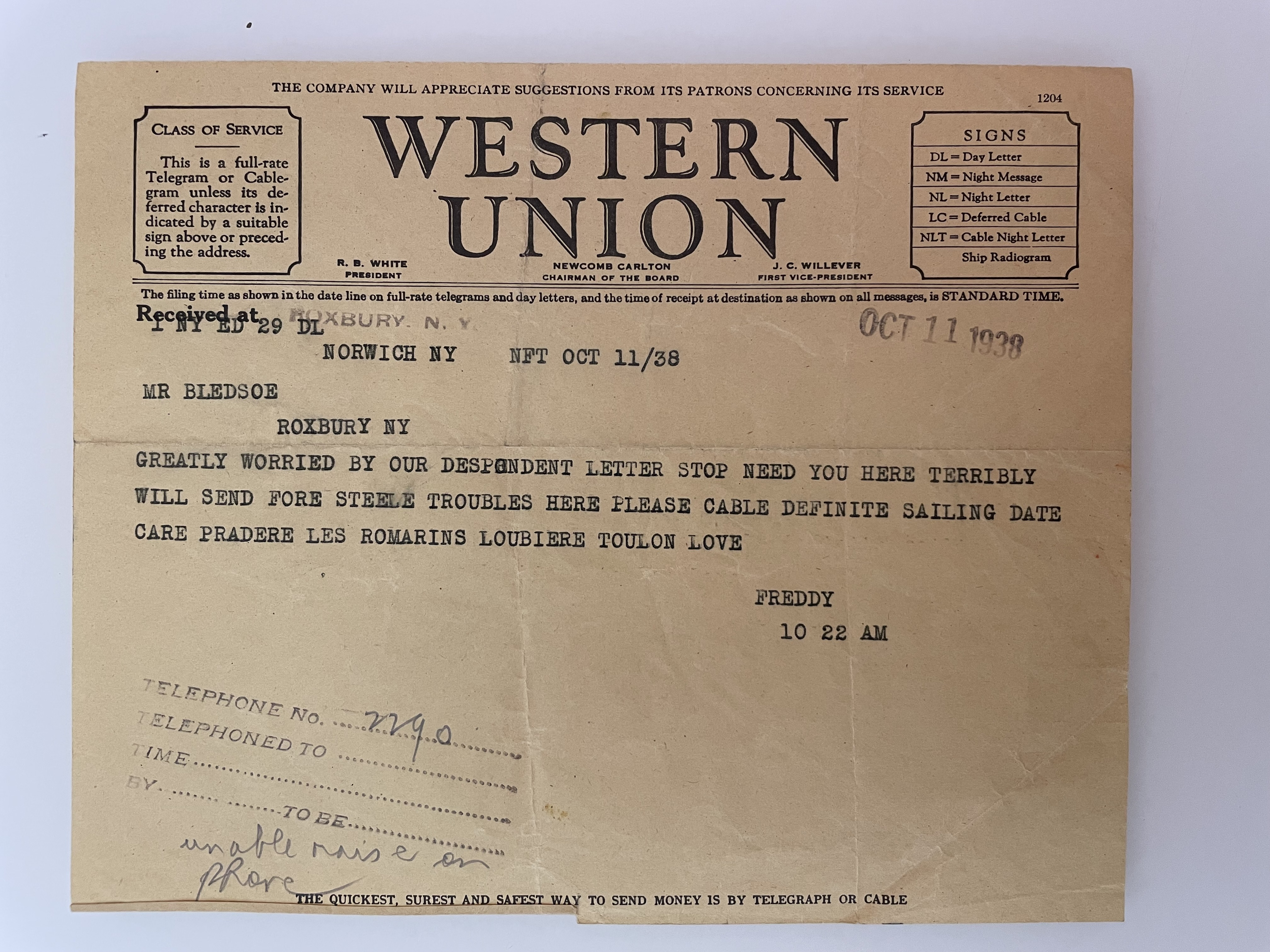
Telegram from Freddy Huygens to Jules Bledsoe, 11 Oct 1938

In London, Bledsoe and Huygens lived together at 21 Lowndes Square and 25 De Walden Street. In New York City, they lived together at 147 East 56th Street (in the parlor floor apartment) from 1934 to 1936. In March 1940, Bledsoe and Huygens moved to Hollywood, Los Angeles, California so that Bledsoe could pursue the next phase of his career in film. Their shared home is described in Clarence Rhambo’s self-published biography of Bledsoe. According to the 1940 Census record, the house was at 6930 Camrose Drive in Hollywood, rented by Adrian F. Huygens, age 40, of the Netherlands. Mr. Bledsoe is not listed. They later lived at 6642 Emmet Terrace in Hollywood.

When Bledsoe died in July 1943, his aunt Naomi Cobb had his body brought to Waco, Texas for the funeral and burial. A spray of red roses from Huygens covered the casket. Heartbroken, Huygens decided to leave the Hollywood house he had shared with Bledsoe; he wrote to Naomi Cobb, “I cannot bear being in this house any longer, where every object speaks of him, and where I would suffocate.”

== Legacy and death ==
Bledsoe died in Hollywood, California, on July 14, 1943 following a cerebral hemorrhage. At his funeral at New Hope Baptist Church in Waco, Texas, he was eulogized by J. J. Rhoades, the President of Bishop College, and A. J. Armstrong, the President of Baylor University. Bledsoe is buried in Greenwood Cemetery, a city-owned cemetery in Waco, Texas. His papers, including sheet music, photographs, and correspondence, are housed in The Texas Collection at Baylor University. The Jules Bledsoe papers, 1931–1939 are held in the Manuscripts, Archives and Rare Books Division at the Schomburg Center for Research in Black Culture, which is one of the research centers of the New York Public Library. These papers consist of correspondence, contracts, musical compositions, legal documents, financial records, programs, broadsides, and news clippings documenting Bledsoe's professional career, particularly in Europe. The Bledsoe-Miller Community Center, a recreation facility in Waco, is jointly named for Bledsoe and Doris Miller.

== Partial filmography ==
- Drums of the Congo (1942)

== See also ==
- List of people from Harlem
