= Willy Sluiter =

Dutch painter (1873–1949)

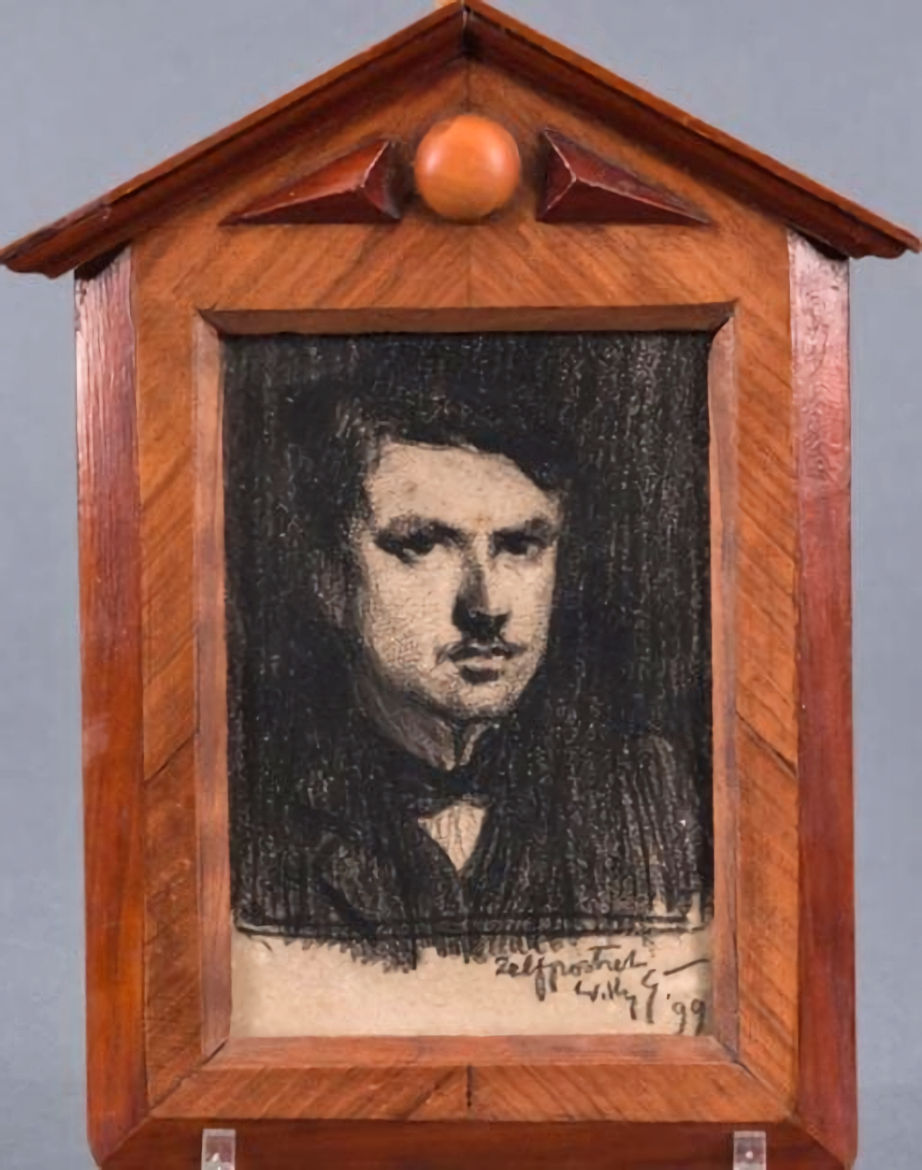
Self-portrait (1899)

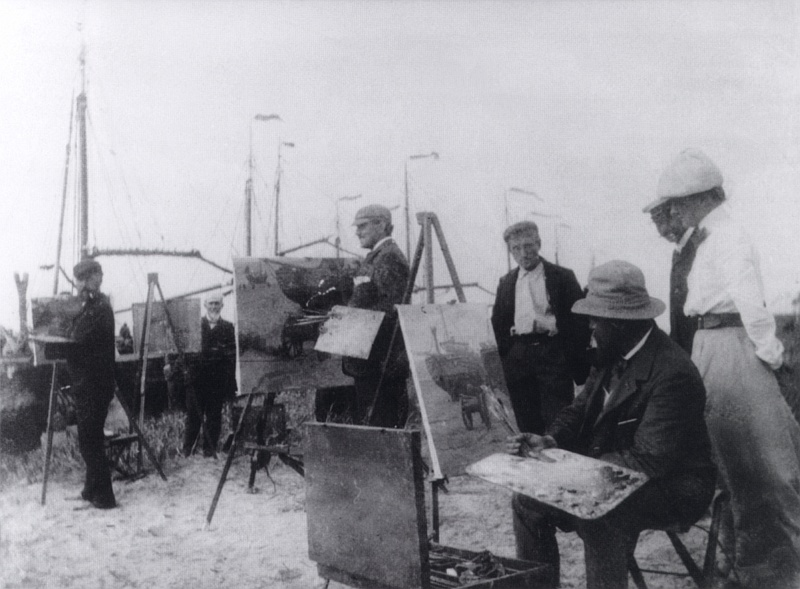
Dutch artists in Katwijk. Left Dirk Wiggers, centre Willy Sluiter, right Hendrik Jansen (1904)

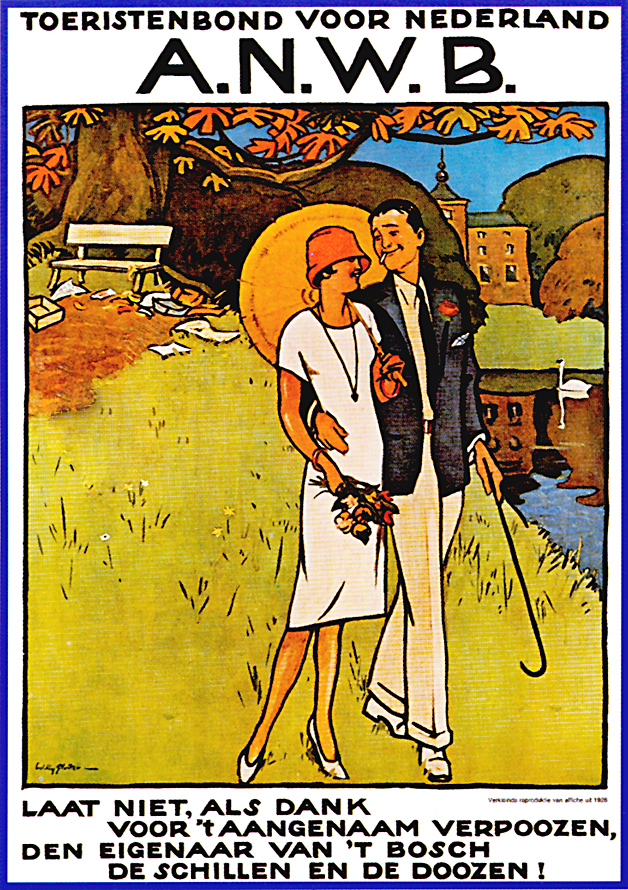
Poster Laat niet als dank... (1926)

Jan Willem "Willy" Sluiter (24 May 1873 in Amersfoort – 22 May 1949 in The Hague) was a Dutch painter. He was best known for his paintings of Dutch villages and its dwellers, and also did portraits of members of Dutch high society. His work was part of the art competitions at four Olympic Games.

== Family ==
Sluiter was a member of a family of ministers. Sluiter grew up in Heerenveen (until 1883) and Zwijndrecht (from 1883) as the son of notary mr. Jan Willem Sluiter (1839–1902) and Johanna Hillegonda Cornelia Suermondt (1846–1931). In 1901 he married Agatha Anna Louise van Nievervaart (1874–1957) and had a daughter with her, Johanna Adriana (1902–1991).

== Career ==
Sluiter became a versatile artist. He lived and worked in more than one place, in Dordrecht and Rotterdam, but also in villages that were popular with painters such as Scheveningen, Katwijk and Laren. Sluiter was a member of many art societies, including Pictura in Dordrecht, Arti et Amicitiae in Amsterdam and Pulchri Studio in The Hague.

He was a student at the Rotterdam Academy of Visual Arts from 1891 to 1894 followed by taking lessons at the Hague Academy of Visual Arts. He became a well-known painter, illustrator of political cartoons, made many posters, worked as a freelancer for advertising jobs and also designed book covers. Well-known are the 38 covers for sheet music that he designed for publisher Scheltens and Giltay between 1920 and 1925; those were cabaret texts by the poet Clinge Doorenbos. In 1934 he designed the poster for the touring production of the opera The Emperor Jones, starring the American baritone Jules Bledsoe in the title role of Brutus Jones.

He lived and worked in Zwijndrecht, Dordrecht and Rotterdam until 1894. From 1894 to 1897 he would reside in Scheveningen and from 1901 to 1910 in Katwijk. In 1910 he settled in Laren and remained there until 1916 when he moved to The Hague.

Sluiter's work was included in the 1939 exhibition and sale Onze Kunst van Heden (Our Art of Today) at the Rijksmuseum in Amsterdam.

The subjects of Sluiter's work often came from the coast and the life of fishermen, but he was also a sought-after painter of portraits for the upper class. He captured Hille Butter, a model from Volendam several times.

In 1999 the Dordrechts Museum featured an exhibition about the posters of Willy Sluiter for the occasion of his passing being 50 years ago. From 1 October 2013 to 11 January 2014, the Katwijks Museum exhibited his works.

Sluiter collaborated with the Royal Dutch Touring Club and created a number of posters for them. The 1926 poster Laat niet als dank... advertising garbage collection is considered to be iconic in the Netherlands.

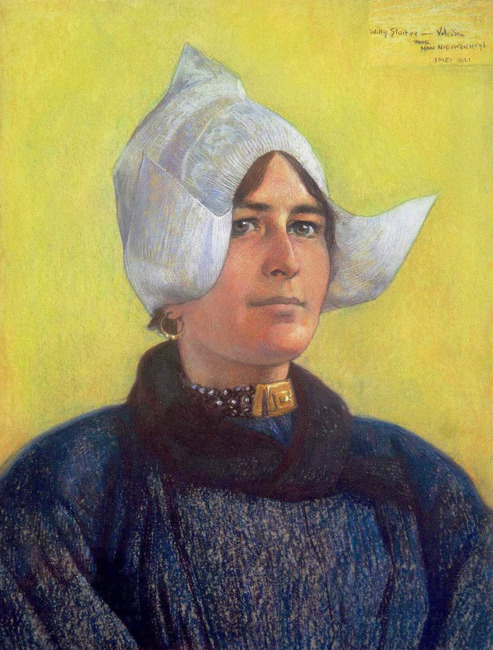
Hille Butter

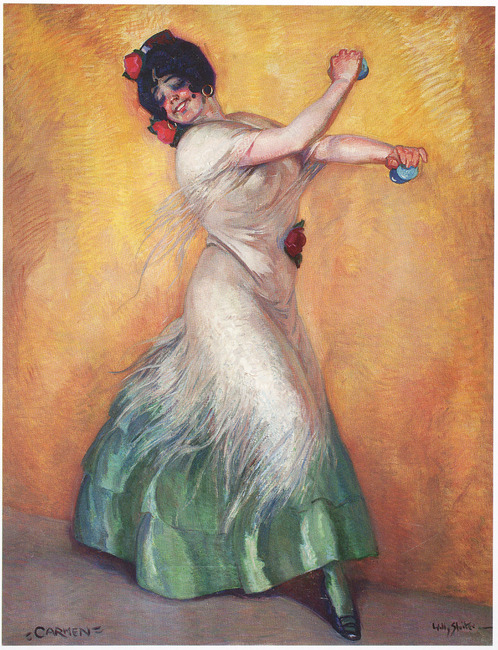
Carmen (1915)

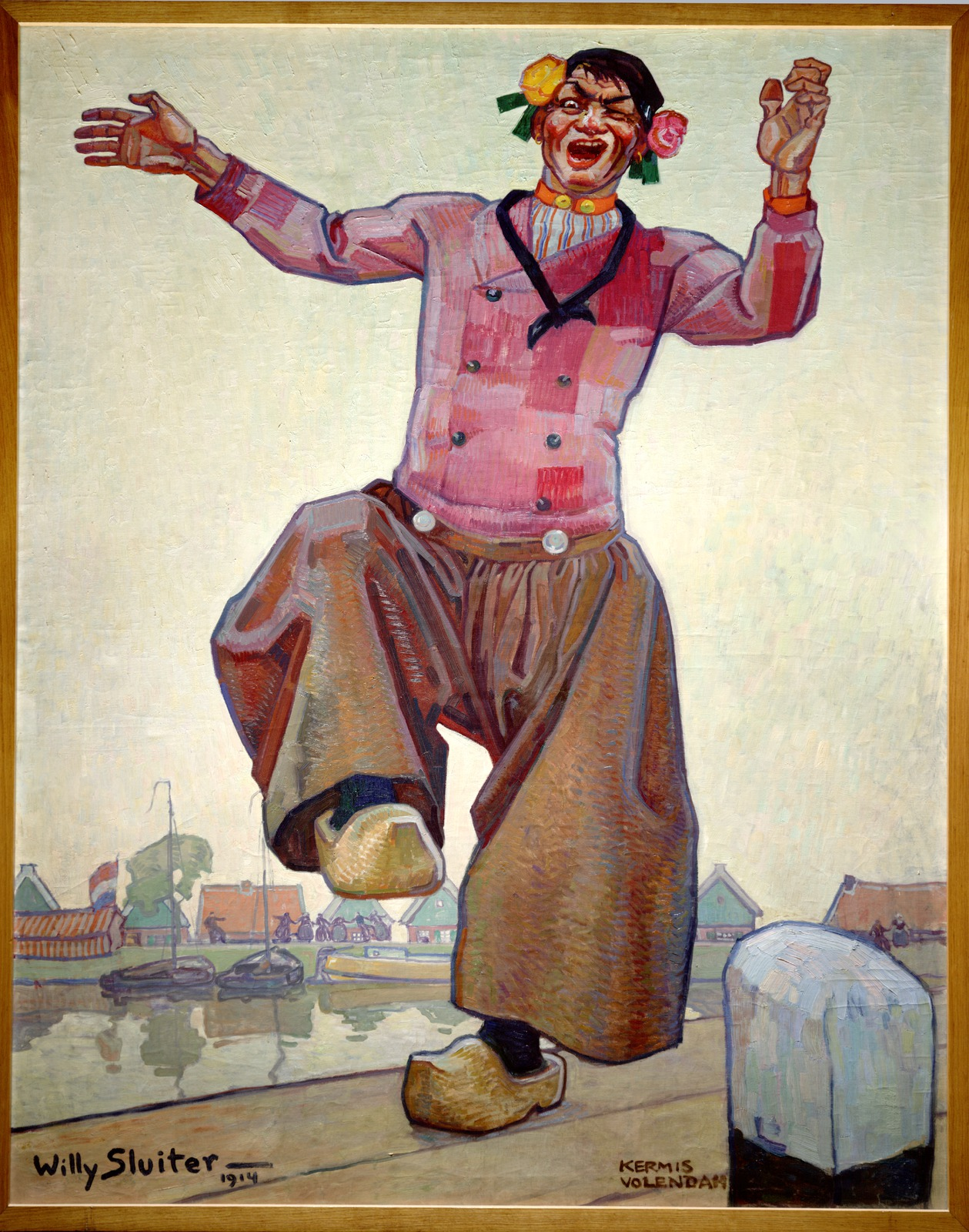
Dancing man from Volendam

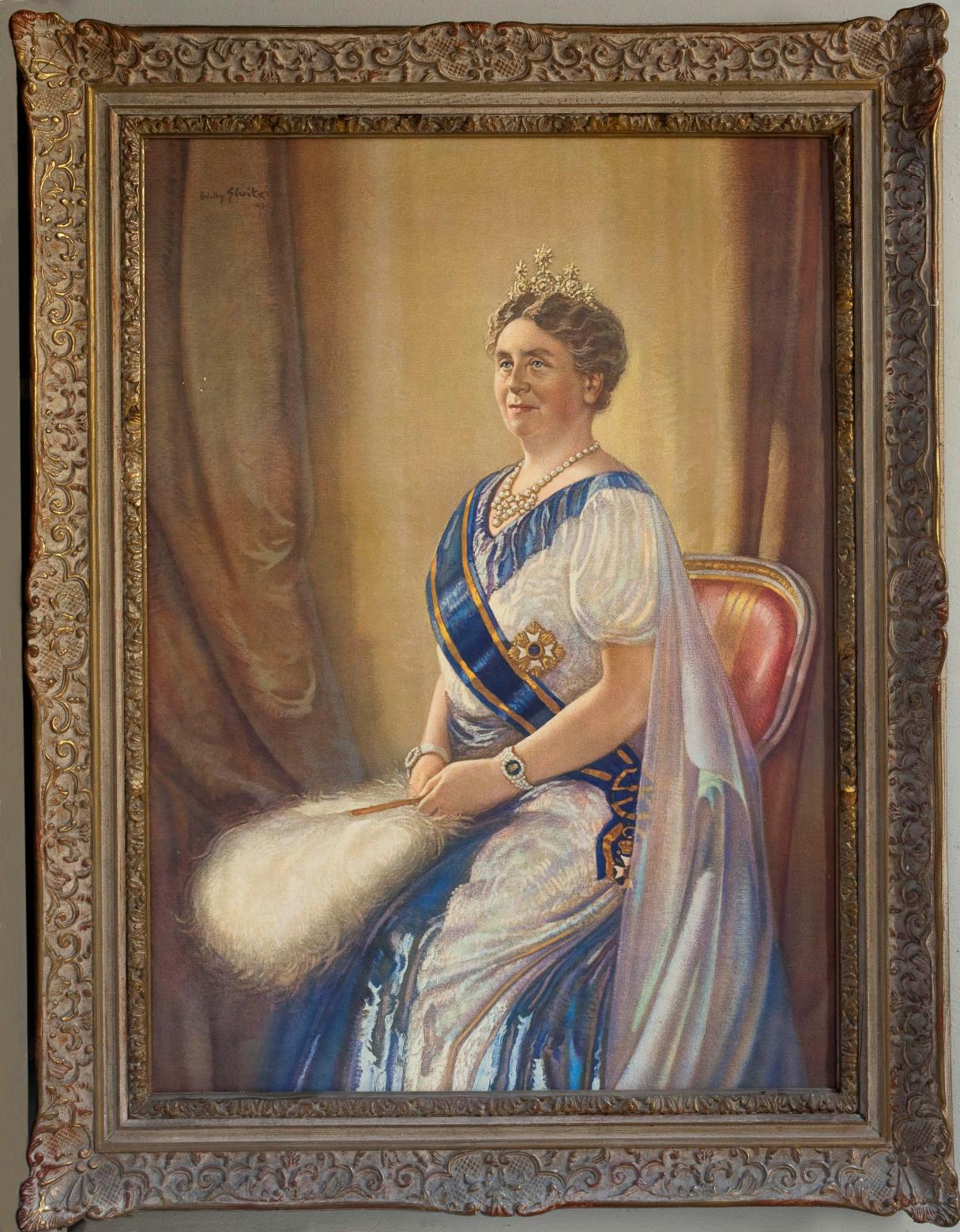
Queen Wilhelmina

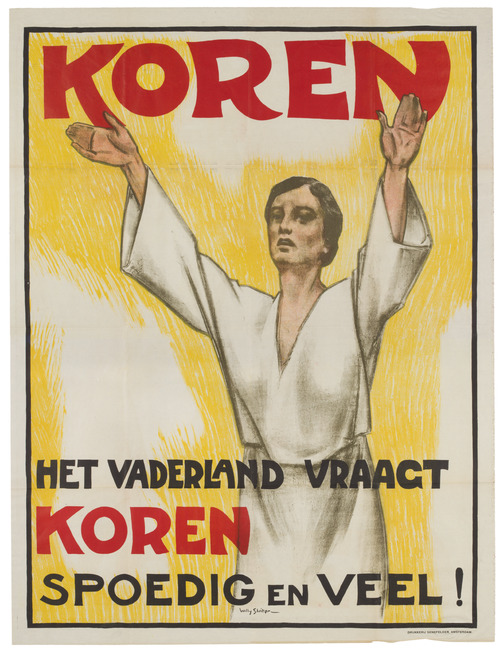
Poster Corn

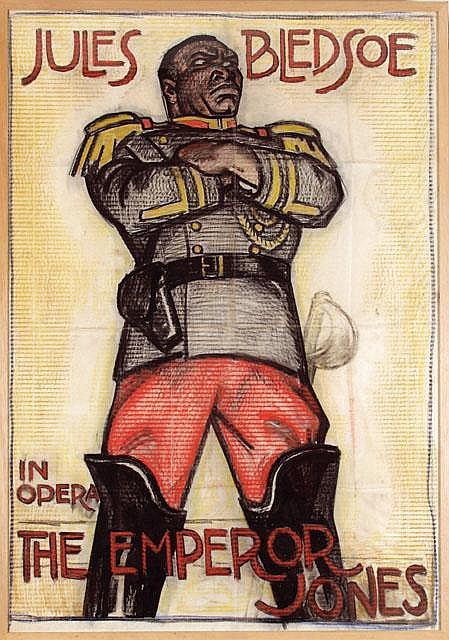
Opera The Emperor Jones, 1934
