= Hemsley Winfield =

African-American dancer

Hemsley Winfield (April 20, 1907 – January 15, 1934) was an African-American dancer who created the New Negro Art Theater Dance Group.

== Early years ==
He was born Osborne Hemsley Winfield to a middle-class, African-American family in Yonkers, New York. Winfield struggled in Yonkers as jobs available to African-Americans remained menial. Contrary to the natural inclination to the residents of Yonkers at that time, Winfield pursued a career in the Arts, developing a strong background as an actor, director, stage technician, dancer and eventually a choreographer. With combination of Winfield's middle-class ambition as well as the growing cultural movement of the African-Americans at that time, Winfield was able to achieve acclaim by the Art world. In 1928, Winfield played the roles of Porter, Male Black Figure, Ethiopian, and the King of Borneo in E. E. Cummings' play Him at the Provincetown Playhouse. Winfield first won his fame as the leading role of Oscar Wilde's Salome, which he won acclaim to in 1929. Winfield came upon the role as Salome when the female lead of the company fell ill, causing Winfield to dress in drag as the show was staged at the Cherry Lane Theater in Greenwich Village, New York. Winfield, during this time, continued to attend concerts by the great trailblazers of modern dance, who later served as an influence and sponsor for his choreographic work.

== The New Negro Art Theater Dance Group ==
As part of the “Little Theater movement” Winfield started and directed the Sekondi Players of Yonkers in 1925. In November 1927 Winfield and the Sekondi Players performed a children's play, The Princess and the Cat, written by his mother, Jeroline Hemsley Winfield. Winfield called the group "Sekondi" after a city located on the south west coast of Ghana. The 1927 inaugural opening of children's plays was under his direction of The New Negro Art Theater. This is the first reference to the New Negro Art Theater group that Winfield directed during the rest of his acting and dance career. On March 6, 1931, at the Saunders Trade School the dance company gave its first performance. Winfield served as the head organizer and director of the company. The first name of the dance company was The Bronze Ballet Plastique, which lasted only one performance. Edna Guy was trained by Ruth St. Denis of the Denis-Shawn School of Dance, and performed as a guest in at least two of Winfield's concerts which soon grew to draw massive crowds. Edna Guy was never a member of the New Negro Art Theater Dance Group, the leading female dancers of the company were Ollie Burgoyne, Drusela Drew, and Midgie Lane. Winfield's choreographic work during this time fused uniquely German Expressionism with African-American themes and spirituals.

In 1933, the company appeared in the premier of Louis Gruenberg's opera The Emperor Jones at the Metropolitan Opera in New York City. Winfield took on the role of the Congo witch doctor in the piece and became the first African American to dance for the Met and the first to receive a role credit in a Met production His first performance as the Witch Doctor was listed as January 7, 1933 and his last performance was March 18, 1933 Winfield also danced the role of the Witch Doctor in the performances in Philadelphia and Baltimore that year. Controversy around the work resulted from the Met's original request to blacken White dancers' faces rather than use Black dancers, but Tibbett threatened to quit, and the Met relented. His final performance of the 1933 season was reviewed as “a thrilling exhibition of savage dancing” and “his sinister and frantic caperings as the Witch Doctor made even the most sluggish, opera-infected blood run cold.”

On January 15, 1934, Hemsley Winfield died of pneumonia shortly before his 27th birthday, leaving with the final words, "We're building a foundation that will make people take black dance seriously". Hemsley Winfield was considered “the pioneer in Negro concert dancing. In that field he attained for his race an eminence comparable to that of Paul Robeson in the musical field. He achieved amazing results in such a short time."

== Contributions ==
Winfield's most influential contribution was his ongoing support of the "new negro", promoting a rush of African-American talent during this period of time. Winfield used the black body in dance and other art forms as raw material in order to show racial configuration within his company to an audience. Winfield projected this "new negro" in support of the Harlem Renaissance, a movement referring to the artistic and sociocultural awakening among African-Americans during the 1920s and 1930s as a response to the political and economic events resulting from World War 1. In October 1933, one of Winfield's first Forum Recitals was “What shall the Negro dance about?” He opened the forum discussion by stating: “all races, no matter what color, had fundamental human feelings and ideas to express in movement.” The Negro has primitive African material that he should never lose. The Negro has his work songs of the South which he alone can express. It's hard for me to say what the Negro should dance about. What has anyone to dance about?"

== Response to his work ==
The majority of supporters of the Harlem Renaissance Movement endorsed the work of Winfield and his counterparts such as Dunham and Edna Guy. Critics considered Winfield to be "the initiator and chief exponent of Negro concert dancing in the United States." Some, however, did not quite support the message he had been trying to create with his choreographic style. Critic John Martin remarked that he felt as though the "Negro dancers [were] performing material associated with white dancers." This inevitable gap between what the public thought to be suitable for black and white dancers respectively was, in fact, the gap that Winfield spent his career trying to fill. Martin also noted that Winfield had not fallen into the trap of reproducing “white” choreography or to associating himself with the “amusement business” of Harlem. The first trap would have made his company a novelty and his company would not have lasted, and the second would have put him into the category of performances for “white amusement seekers.” Part of Winfield's struggle both politically and choreographically, naturally, was from where he drew inspiration. Having come from a period of time where the past was predominately filled with white dancers, The question of what black dancers should look like, move like, and reflect on, was brought to the table by Winfield and his peers. The question was not completely solved until the 1940s.
