= Edna Guy =

African-American modern dance pioneer

Edna Guy (1907–1982) was an African-American modern dance pioneer. Born in 1907 in Summit, New Jersey, Guy lived at a time when blacks and whites did not appear on stage together. At the age of fifteen she begged her mother to take her to a dance concert in Greenwich Village where she watched Modern Dance pioneer Ruth St. Denis perform the Incense Dance. From that point onwards Guy developed a lifelong relationship with modern dance world, especially in the African- American context.

== Early years ==
Guy’s parents lived a meager existence but still encouraged their only child’s interest in dance, funding her training to the best of their ability. After seeing Ruth St. Denis perform, Guy became smitten with her and sent her a note backstage which she signed “Edna Guy, colored girl”. St. Denis mentions in her autobiography “An Unfinished life” that she was touched by Guys note; the very note which was the impetus for a continuous wave of correspondence between the two. Guy lionized St. Denis, calling her “utterly beautiful” in one of the poems she later wrote for her and yearned to dance at Denishawn, the school set up by St. Denis and her husband Ted Shawn but St. Denis deemed her unready. Still, St. Denis was highly maternalistic in her correspondence with Guy which lasted between 1923 and 1940 . In fact, St Denis herself wrote “from that day until now I have become her white mama” . This statement is especially significant because Guy’s mother died in 1926. With few options available in concert dance for people of her race, Guy auditioned as a chorus girl but was never cast in any roles because she was too dark. In one letter, St. Denis responded to Guy’s frustrations saying: "Dear Girlie, Yes, I know you have this race problem with you constantly, and a big problem it is. But, you see, dear, you are a very ignorant little girl in relation to the conditions in this big city. Some things cannot be forced or hurried". The two concurred that Guy needed to become more technically skilled before entering Denishawn and so she stayed under the tutelage of Ms. Linnel, her dance teacher in Harlem who taught entertainment-geared dance and did not plunge Guy into the modern dance world that she longed to be a part of. In 1924 Guy was finally admitted to the Denishawn School in New York .

== Years at Denishawn ==
In a letter dated August 31, 1924, Guy mentions starting Denishawn in October of that year . Her primary teacher was Katherine Edison who taught her technique and dramatic gesture based on the principles of Delsarte. She also took private classes from Paul Mathis and repertory classes from Hazel Krans who taught her dances such as ‘ ‘Temple Bells’ ‘ and ‘ ‘Dancing Girl of Dehli’ ‘. Guy wrote of her earlier experience at Denishawn in a letter to St.Denis: “The future holds much brightness for me—I smile, I learn, I dance and wait—and I’m happy”. During this time, Guy was also taking classes at Hunter College, studying typing and shorthand . She first travelled with the company from September 1927 until May 1928 as St. Denis’ personal assistant. It was also through St. Denis that Guy met Japanese-American photographer Soichi Sunami, who took some of the few surviving portraits of her.

After three years of training at Denishawn, Guy was still only allowed to perform in-house recitals, her race being the hindering factor. In 1930 she continued as St. Denis’ seamstress and wardrobe assistant. At this time also, Guy, in conjunction with friends, created dances to Negro spirituals that her mother loved. While St. Denis was away on tour Guy was asked to leave the company due to a misunderstanding. They did however reconcile later on in life .

== After Denishawn ==
Now on her own, Guy started off struggling, engaging in odd jobs including those of maid, cook, and artist's model. She auditioned for pieces but never got any roles, which she stated was because “the light skinned girls with the flashing eyes” got all the parts. Guy began to connect with other artists such as fellow African-American dancer/ choreographer Hemsley Winfield. She struggled with depression which disrupted her desire to start her own company, but by March 1931 she was performing with the New Negro Art Theatre as a featured artist alongside Winfield. For this show, she choreographed and performed Madrassi Nautch, a variation of one of St. Denis’ most popular types of dances. Soon after, in April 1931 she co-directed the “First Negro Dance Recital In America” with Winfield during which she performed the piece A Figure From Angkor Wat. She also staged other works that year, including her “dance spirituals”, at the Chanin Theatre. In May of the same year she put on a concert at Harlem’s 138th Street Young Women’s Christian Association (YWCA) in which her choreography was followed by St. Denis’ lecture entitled Dance as An Art. Guy also received mention in the August 1931 issue of Dance Magazine, announcing that she was to feature in an upcoming staging of Oscar Wilde’s Salome with the Sierra Leonean-born Asadata Dafora. On May 7, 1932 Guy staged a concert at Roerich Hall in a program organized by the Washington Conservatory of Music and School of Expression. where she performed five solos including African Plastique, her first piece in which she drew from African themes.

In 1937 Guy cemented her role as an organizer in the African-American dance community when she and Allison Burroughs staged Negro Dance Evening on March 7. This show catapulted Katherine Dunham’s company, which at the time included dancer/ choreographer Talley Beatty, into the limelight. The concert highlighted different cultures of the African diaspora . In the third part of the program, dubbed United States, the piece Shout was performed by Guy and Burroughs with Clarence Yates, Archie Savage, Leonard Barros. In the final section of the concert, Modern Trends, Guy performed her solo After Gauguin. The program was concluded by a performance of Negro Songs of Protest, a piece co-choreographed by her and Burroughs. The show was reviewed in Dance Magazine and deemed “spectacular entertainment”. In that same year Guy organized “Dance International” which took place at Rockefeller Center and featured performances of about forty groups. In 1938 Guy opened a dance school in New York and in 1939 she served on the American Dance Association committee.

== Later years ==
Edna Guy married Walter McCully on May 21, 1939, and later moved with him to Enfield, New Hampshire. By this time she had given up her dance career, in part due to the Great Depression. She suffered a series of heart attacks in the mid-1940s. By the 1960s she was again living in New York, in the city of Hudson. Edna Guy died in 1983 in Fort Worth, Texas, where she had been living for the previous seven years.

== Works by Edna Guy ==
- Madrassi Nautch (1931)
- Luleta’s Dance (1932)
- After Gauguin (1932)
- Gimme Yo Han (1932)
- Juba (1932)
- Negro Songs of Protest (co- choreographed with Alison Burroughs; 1937)
