= Drums of the Congo =

1942 film directed by Christy Cabanne

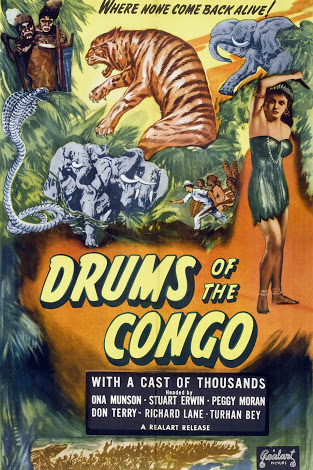
- Poster for the film
- Directed by: Christy Cabanne
- Written by: Paul Huston; Roy Chanslor
- Produced by: Henry MacRae
- Starring: Ona Munson; Stuart Erwin; Peggy Moran
- Cinematography: George Robinson
- Edited by: Maurice Wright
- Music by: H. J. Salter
- Production company: Universal Pictures
- Release date: July 17, 1942 (US)
- Running time: 61 minutes
- Country: United States
- Language: English

Drums of the Congo is a 1942 American drama film, directed by Christy Cabanne. It stars Ona Munson, Stuart Erwin, and Peggy Moran, and was released on July 17, 1942.

== Cast ==
- Ona Munson as Dr. Ann Montgomery
- Stuart Erwin as Congo Jack
- Peggy Moran as Enid Waldron
- Don Terry as Capt. Kirk Armstrong
- Richard Lane as George Coutlass
- Jules Bledsoe as Kalu
- Turhan Bey as Juma
- Ernest Whitman as King Malaba
- Edwin Stanley as Col. S. C. Robinson
- Jess Lee Brooks as Chief Madjeduka

== Reception ==
The Motion Picture Herald gave it a "fair" review, taking issue with the thinness of the plot. Photoplay liked the picture even less simply stating, "Voo hooey!" in their rating of the film. However, they did commend the performances of Ona Munson and Richard Lane, and particularly enjoyed the work of Stuart Erwin. New York's Daily News gave the film a poor review giving it a 1/2 star, with the reviewer saying, "There was only one thing which kept me from crying when I saw this all-around puerile production. It is so bad I laughed at it."
