= Vincent La Selva =

American conductor

Vincent La Selva (September 17, 1929 – October 9, 2017 in Cleveland, Ohio) was an American conductor. Born in Cleveland, Ohio, he began performing at the age of 8 and by the age of 12 he was conducting student performances. He received his bachelor's degree from the Juilliard School, where he served on the faculty beginning in 1969. After his graduation from Juilliard, he served in the United States Army where he conducted the First Army band at Fort Jay on Governor's Island.

His idea of presenting free productions began in 1954 when he founded the Xavier Symphony Society, made up of volunteer performers. Gian-Carlo Menotti was so taken by La Selva's performance of The Saint of Bleecker Street, that Menotti had La Selva perform the piece at New York's City Opera. This led to his being hired to conduct the City Opera's orchestra full-time.

== Founding of the New York Grand Opera Company ==
La Selva founded the New York Grand Opera Company in 1973. Beginning in 1974, he performed complete operas at no charge to the public in New York City's Central Park. One of the most ambitious projects of the NYGO was the chronological presentation, from 1994 onwards, of all of Verdi's operas, beginning with Oberto (1839) and ending with Falstaff in 2000 and with the finale of the series being the Requiem Mass performed on the 100th anniversary of Verdi's death, 27 January 2001, at Carnegie Hall. In November 2006, NYGO performed Beethoven's symphony no.9 at the Isaac Stern Auditorium at Carnegie Hall with soprano Maria Knapik, mezzo-soprano Jeeminn Lee, tenor Edward Perretti and baritone Fredrick Redd.

== Other conducting venues ==
La Selva conducted the New Jersey Symphony, the Symphony of the Air, the Juilliard Symphony, the Brno State Philharmonic and the Bern Symphony.

== Awards and honors ==
In 1995 the President of Italy knighted La Selva as a "Cavaliere" in the Order of Merit of the Italian Republic for his performances of Giuseppe Verdi works.

La Selva received the Handel Medallion for his contributions to the cultural life of New York City. He was awarded the world record for performing all of Verdi's works in chronological order and ending with the last on the 100th anniversary of Verdi's death.
