= The Emperor Jones (Kraft Television Theatre) =

- Kraft Television Theatre episode
- Episode no.: Season 8 Episode 22
- Directed by: Fielder Cook
- Based on: The Emperor Jones; 1920 play by Eugene O'Neill
- Production code: 404
- Original air date: 23 February 1955

Episode chronology
← Previous "Departure"	Next → "Half the World's a Bride"

"The Emperor Jones" is a television play episode of the American television anthology series Kraft Television Theatre. It was directed by Fielder Cook, starred Ossie Davis in the title role and aired on 23 February 1955.

O'Neill's play opened on Broadway, New York City, New York, USA at the Neighborhood Playhouse on 1 November 1920 and ran for 204 performances.

== Cast ==
- Ossie Davis as Brutus Jones
