= The Emperor Jones =

1920 play by Eugene O'Neill

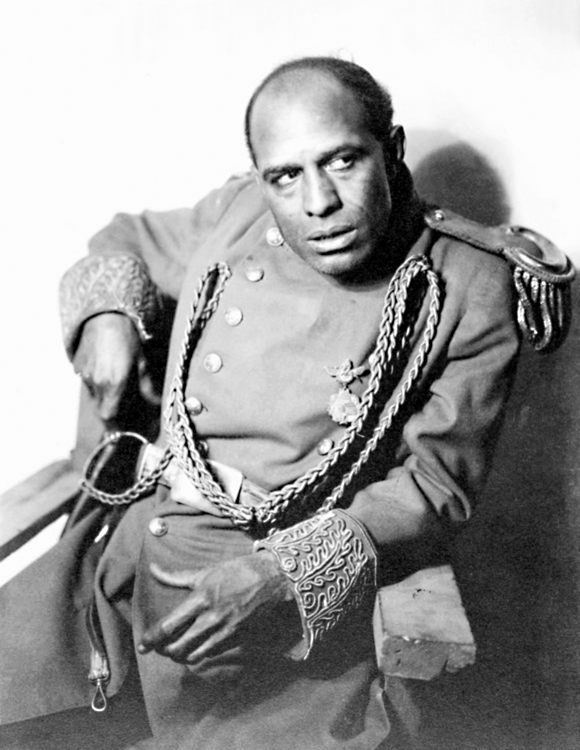
- Charles Sidney Gilpin in The Emperor Jones in 1920
- Original language: English
- Written by: Eugene O'Neill
- Subject: A petty tyrant attempts to flee his ill-gotten kingdom but is lost in the jungle and haunted by his past.
- Genre: Tragedy
- Setting: A West Indian island not yet self-determined, but for the moment, an empire.

Premiere
- Date: November 1, 1920
- Place: Provincetown Playhouse; New York City, U.S.

The Emperor Jones is a 1920 tragic play by American dramatist Eugene O'Neill about the final day in the rule of Emperor Brutus Jones, a resourceful, self-assured African American and a former Pullman porter, who is making his escape from his island kingdom while being haunted by ghosts of his past. Lost in the jungle, Brutus encounters phantoms recalling how he got here, including a black man he killed over a dice game, a violent escape from a prison chain gang, and a slave auction of his forebears.

Originally called The Silver Bullet, the play is one of O'Neill's major experimental works, mixing expressionism and realism, and the use of an unreliable narrator and multiple points of view. It was also an oblique commentary on the U.S. occupation of Haiti after bloody rebellions there, an act of imperialism that was much condemned in O'Neill's radical political circles in New York. The Emperor Jones draws on O'Neill's own hallucinatory experience hacking through the jungle while prospecting for gold in Honduras in 1909, as well as the brief, brutal presidency of Haiti's Vilbrun Guillaume Sam.

The Emperor Jones was O'Neill's first big box-office hit. It established him as a successful playwright, after he won the Pulitzer Prize for Drama for his first play, the much less well-known Beyond the Horizon (1920). The Emperor Jones was included in Burns Mantle's The Best Plays of 1920–1921.

== Synopsis ==
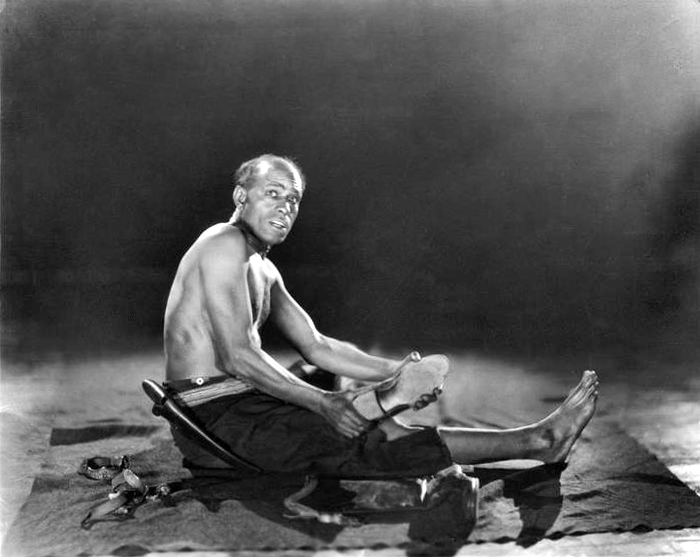
Brutus Jones, played by Charles Sidney Gilpin, removes his shoes to facilitate his flight through the jungle in the original Provincetown Playhouse production of The Emperor Jones (1920)

The Emperor Jones is about Brutus Jones, a Black American Pullman porter who escapes to an island in the West Indies. In two years, Jones makes himself "Emperor" of the place. A native tried to shoot Jones, but the gun misfired; thereupon Jones announced that he was protected by a charm and that only silver bullets could harm him.

When the play begins, he has been Emperor long enough to amass a fortune by imposing heavy taxes on the islanders and carrying on all sorts of large-scale corruption. Rebellion is brewing. The islanders are whipping up their courage to a fighting point by calling on the local gods and demons of the forest. From the deep of the jungle, the steady beat of a big drum sounded by them is heard, increasing its tempo towards the end of the play and showing the rebels' presence dreaded by the Emperor. It is the equivalent of the heart-beat which assumes a higher and higher pitch; while coming closer it denotes the premonition of approaching punishment and the climactic recoil of internal guilt of the hero; he wanders and falters in the jungle, present throughout the play with its primeval terror and blackness.

The play is virtually a monologue for its leading character, Jones, in a Shakespearean range from regal power to the depths of terror and insanity, comparable to Lear or Macbeth. Scenes 2 to 7 are from the point of view of Jones, and no other character speaks. The first and last scenes are essentially a framing device with a character named Smithers, a white trader who appears to be part of illegal activities. In the first scene, Smithers is told about the rebellion by an old woman, and then has a lengthy conversation with Jones. In the last scene, Smithers converses with Lem, the leader of the rebellion. Smithers has mixed feelings about Jones, though he generally has more respect for Jones than for the rebels. During the final scene, Jones is killed by a silver bullet, which was the only way that the rebels believed Jones could be killed, and the way in which Jones planned to kill himself if he was captured.

== Characters ==
- Brutus Jones, Emperor
- Smithers, a Cockney Trader
- An Old Native Woman
- Lem, a Native Chief
- Soldiers, Adherents of Lem

The Little Formless Fears; Jeff; The Negro Convicts; The Prison Guard; The Planters; The Auctioneer; The Slaves; The Congo Witch-Doctor; The Crocodile God

== Inspiration ==
The expansive personality and style of speech seen in Brutus Jones was modeled on Adam Scott, an African-American and close friend of O'Neill's. Scott tended bar at O'Neill's favorite tavern, at the rear of Holt's Grocery on Main Street, in his hometown of New London, Connecticut. In their biography of O'Neill, Arthur and Barbara Gelb report that,

Scott's imperious personality so impressed O'Neill that he later borrowed it for The Emperor Jones. While the play was also derived from other sources, it was Scott's bravado, his superstition and his religious convictions that imbued the character of Brutus Jones.

== Productions ==
=== 1920 premiere ===
The Emperor Jones was first staged on November 1, 1920, by the Provincetown Players at the Provincetown Playhouse in New York City. Charles Sidney Gilpin, a respected leading man from the all-black Lafayette Players of Harlem, was the first actor to play the role of Brutus Jones on stage. There was some conflict over Gilpin's tendency to change O'Neill's use of the word "nigger" to Negro and colored during the play. This production was O'Neill's first real smash hit. The Players' small theater was too small to cope with audience demand for tickets, and the play was transferred to another theater. It ran for 204 performances and was hugely popular, touring in the States with this cast for the next two years.

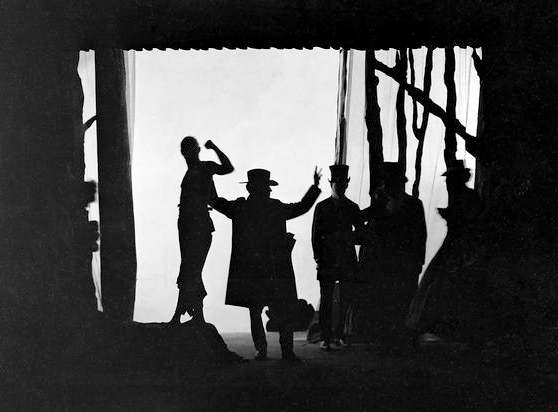
Brutus Jones (Charles S. Gilpin, left) at a slave auction (Scene 5)

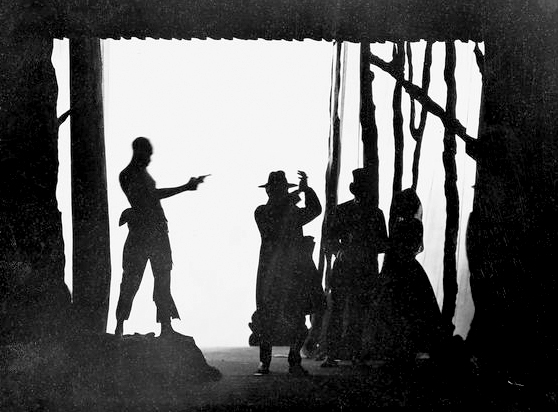
Under the spell of hallucination, Jones fires at the wraiths of an auctioneer and a Southern planter (Scene 5)

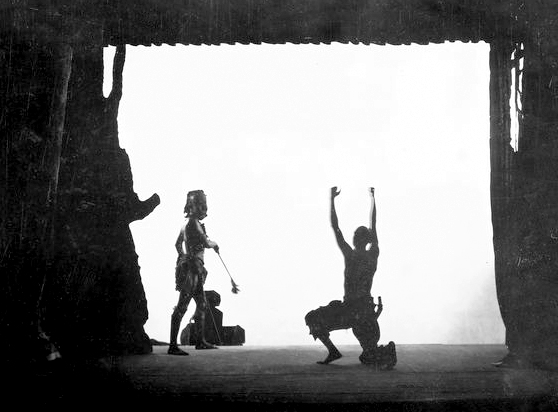
Jones (right) wastes one of his precious bullets on the apparition of a witch doctor (Scene 7)

=== 1925 revival ===
Although Gilpin continued to perform the role of Brutus Jones in the US tour that followed the Broadway closing of the play, he eventually had a falling out with O'Neill. Gilpin wanted O'Neill to remove the word "nigger," which occurred frequently in the play, but the playwright felt its use was consistent with his dramatic intentions. Further, O'Neill defended the language as consistent with the behavior and speech of Adam Scott, the character's inspiration. When they could not come to a reconciliation, O'Neill replaced Gilpin with the young and then unknown Paul Robeson, who previously had only performed on the concert stage. Robeson starred in the title role in the 1925 New York revival (28 performances) and later in the London production.

Robeson starred in the summer production in 1941 at the Ivoryton Playhouse, Ivoryton, Ct.

=== 1926 revival ===
The show was again revived in 1926 at the Mayfair Theatre in Manhattan, with Gilpin again starring as Jones and also co-directing the show with James Light. The production, which ran for 61 performances, is noted for the acting debut of a young Moss Hart as Smithers.

=== Federal Theatre Project ===
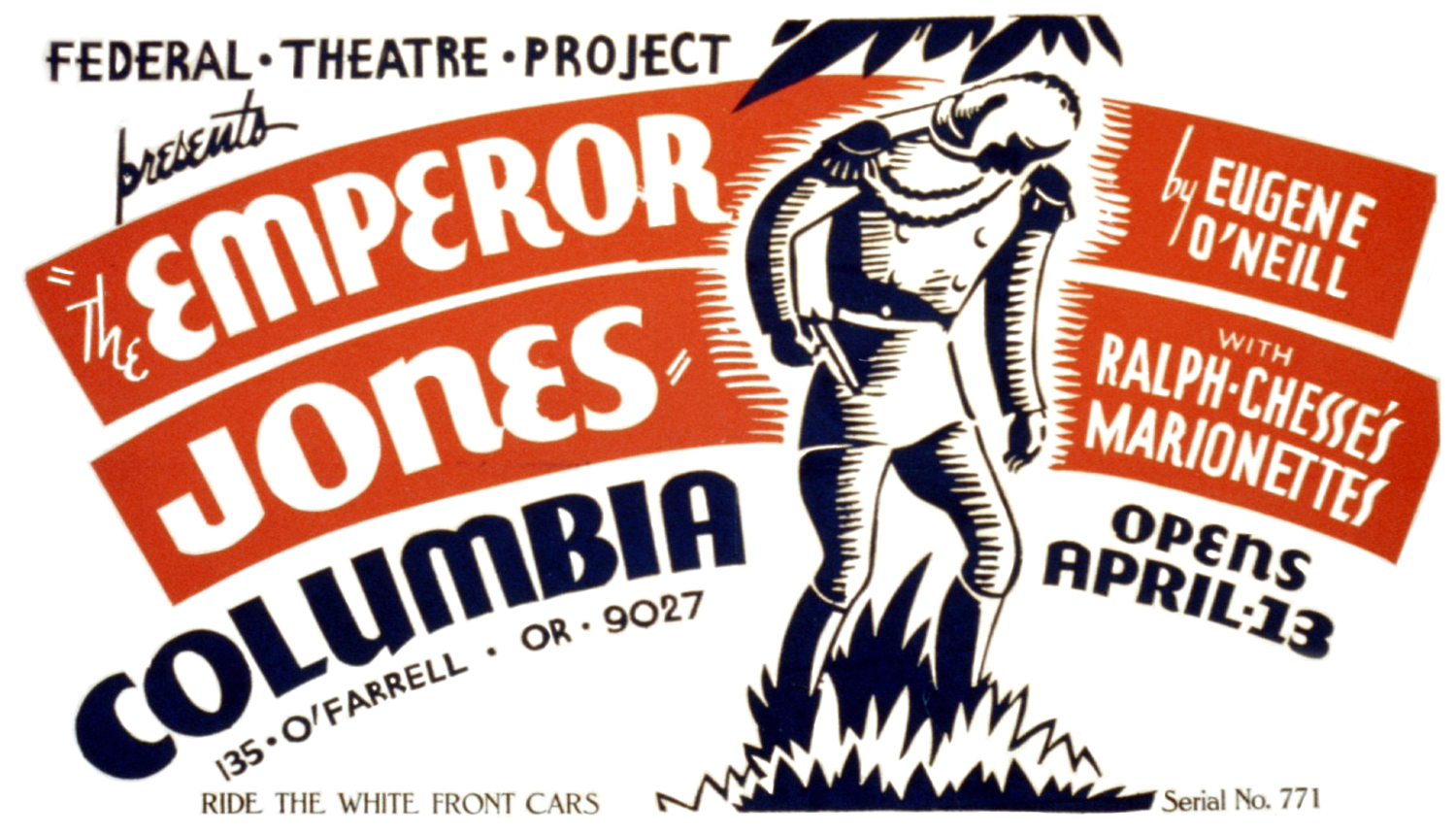
Poster for a 1937 Federal Theater Project production of The Emperor Jones

The Federal Theatre Project of the Works Progress Administration launched several productions of the play in cities across the United States, including a production with marionettes in Los Angeles in 1938.

=== Recent productions ===
In 1980 Richard Negri directed a production at the Royal Exchange, Manchester with Pete Postlethwaite and Albie Woodington.

The Wooster Group started to develop a production of the play in 1992 through a series of work in progress showings. The finished piece opened in 1993 at The Performing Garage. As part of its postdramatic aesthetics, this staging was notable for having an actor play the part of Jones who was female, white, and performed in blackface (Kate Valk). Blackface had been a suggestion for the original production, which O'Neill vetoed.

In 2005 Thea Sharrock directed the play, with Paterson Joseph in the title role, for the Bush Theatre in London. The audience looked down into a sand-filled pit. The claustrophic effect was admired by Michael Billington among others. The production transferred to the Olivier auditorium at The National Theatre, London, in 2007.

New York's Irish Repertory Theatre staged a 2009 revival, which received positive reviews. John Douglas Thompson portrayed Jones.

== Adaptations ==
The play was adapted for a 1933 feature film starring Paul Robeson and directed by Dudley Murphy, an avant-garde filmmaker of O'Neill's Greenwich Village circle who pursued the reluctant playwright for a decade before getting the rights from him.

Louis Gruenberg wrote an opera based on the play, which was premiered at the Metropolitan Opera in New York City in 1933. Baritone Lawrence Tibbett sang the title role, performing in blackface. Paul Robeson's 1936 film Song of Freedom features a scene from the opera with Robeson singing the role of Jones. This has sometimes resulted in a confusion that the 1933 film of O'Neill's play is a film of the opera.

In the UK, BBC Television produced an adaptation in 1938, starring Robert Adams, and another in 1953, starring Gordon Heath.

Several revivals were made in the 1950s when Robeson himself was blacklisted, denied his passport by the State Department and his films — including the 1933 film — recordings and performances were banned in the United States; these new productions were implicitly in defiance of the persecution and suppression of this great star by McCarthyism and the FBI from 1950 until 1958, and part of a worldwide effort of artists to lift the ban.

First, the legendary New York actor Ossie Davis starred in a television adaptation for the Kraft Television Theatre in 1955 — this at a time when black people were rarely seen on American television sets.

In 1956 Heitor Villa-Lobos wrote a ballet based on the play that was commissioned by The Empire Music Festival of New York, and danced by José Limón's company, most of them in blackface — Limón himself a revered teacher at Juilliard and breakthrough performer of color.

A live British television production by ABC Television for the first season of its Armchair Theatre series was seen on UK television on March 30, 1958. It features African-American singer Kenneth Spencer, and was directed by the Canadian director Ted Kotcheff and adapted by the American "beat" novelist Terry Southern in his first screenwriting job. Unlike other British television versions, it still exists, and has been released on DVD.

It was adapted for Australian television in 1960.

An experimental video by Christopher Kondek and Elizabeth LeCompte showcases the production of the play by the New York-based performance troupe The Wooster Group, starring Kate Valk and Willem Dafoe.

A feature movie about Eugene O'Neil, Charles Gilpin, the making of the play and the demise of their relationship was written, directed and produced by Provincetown film maker Arthur Egeli in 2020.
