= The Emperor Jones (opera) =

Opera in two acts composed by Louis Gruenberg

- Opera by Louis Gruenberg
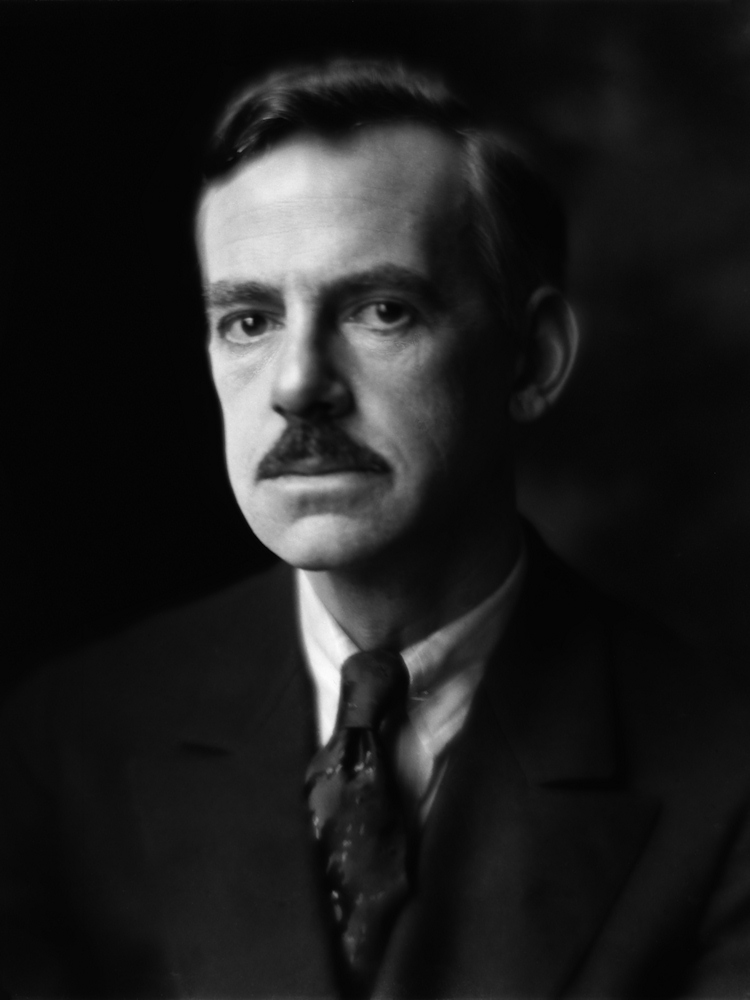
- Eugene O'Neill, after whose play the composer wrote the libretto
- Librettist: Gruenberg, Kathleen de Jaffa
- Language: English
- Based on: The Emperor Jones by Eugene O'Neill
- Premiere: January 7, 1933; Metropolitan Opera, New York

The Emperor Jones is an opera in two acts with a prologue and interlude composed by Louis Gruenberg to an English-language libretto adapted by the composer from Eugene O'Neill's 1920 play, The Emperor Jones. It premiered on January 7, 1933, at the Metropolitan Opera in New York City with Lawrence Tibbett in the title role. Set on an unnamed island in the West Indies, the opera tells the story of African American Brutus Jones, a former Pullman porter and ex-convict who escaped to the island, set himself up as its tyrannical "Emperor", and became rich by exploiting the natives. The natives start a revolt against him, and as he tries to escape through the jungle, he is haunted by visions of his past life and the man he had murdered. As the natives close in, he commits suicide using the silver bullet which he had worn around his neck as a good-luck charm. With a score that incorporates elements of jazz and negro spirituals, The Emperor Jones was the eleventh American opera to premiere at the Met, and has continued to be performed into the 21st century, albeit rarely.

== Background ==
Shortly after becoming General Manager of the Metropolitan Opera in 1908, Giulio Gatti-Casazza had set a goal of producing new English language operas by American composers. During his time at the Met, the company staged the world premieres of thirteen American operas. However, while the composers of these operas were American, only three of them actually had American subjects—Charles Cadman's Shanewis (1918), Howard Hanson's Merry Mount (1934), and Louis Gruenberg's The Emperor Jones.

The Emperor Jones by American playwright Eugene O'Neill had premiered in 1920 and was immensely popular. After reading the play, Gruenberg approached O'Neill with the idea of making it into an opera and discussed the possibilities with him over a two-year period. In 1930 O'Neill gave Gruenberg the rights to adapt the play making any changes he saw fit but refused to have anything to do with creating the libretto, despite the urging of the composer. Despite Kathleen de Jaffa’s name appearing on the libretto, the composers late widow, Irma Greenberg, maintained that Greenberg created the text alone, and that Ms. de Jaffa was merely editor of the libretto series at the Met. The actual lines were taken verbatim from the play. The only two significant changes were the addition of a chanting chorus for the orchestral prelude and interlude, similar to a Greek chorus, and the death of Emperor Jones. In the play, he is killed by the natives while in the opera he shoots himself with a silver bullet as they are closing in on him. The libretto was finished by 1931, and Gruenberg rented a cottage in Old Orchard, Maine, where he composed the opera over a period of fourteen months.

When the vocal score was complete, Gruenberg showed it to the Austrian conductor Erich Kleiber, who at the time was music director of the Berlin State Opera and known for championing new works. Kleiber was impressed and offered to give its world premiere in Berlin. Gruenberg planned to spend the next few months in Germany completing the orchestration. In the end, the premiere was postponed. The rise of Nazism meant that an opera composed by a Jew with a black man as the central character was bound to cause trouble in Germany. (Two years later, Kleiber resigned from his post at the Berlin Opera in protest at the Nazi policy of banning Entartete Musik, "degenerate music", a label applied to virtually all works by Jewish composers). In the meantime, Olin Downes, the critic for The New York Times, had also seen the score and recommended it to Gatti-Casazza, who accepted it for production during the Met's 1932/1933 season.

== Performance history ==
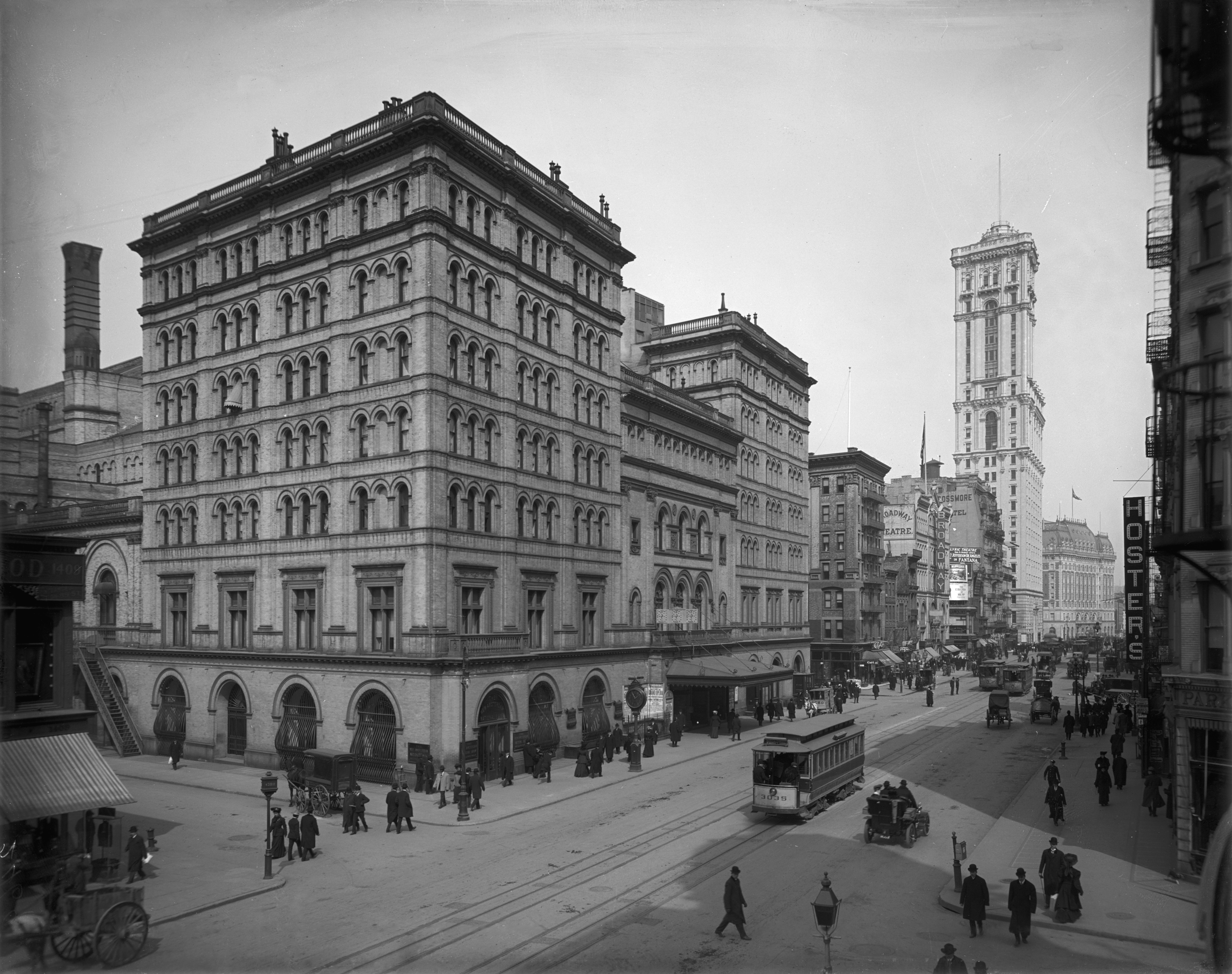
The Metropolitan Opera House on 39th St, where The Emperor Jones premiered on January 7, 1933

The Emperor Jones had its world premiere on January 7, 1933, at the Metropolitan Opera with Lawrence Tibbett in the title role and was also broadcast live on radio. Although both Tibbett and Pearl Besuner used blackface for their roles, the dancers were from Hemsley Winfield's New Negro Art Theater, with Winfield himself taking the role of the Witch Doctor. Initially the Met had wanted to use white dancers in black makeup, but backed down when Tibbett threatened to quit the production unless Winfield and his troupe performed. However, the Met billed the ensemble as the "Hemsley Winfield Ballet" instead of its real name and apart from Winfield did not credit any of the other dancers by name on the playbill. The premiere performance was conducted by Tullio Serafin and directed by Alexander Sanine. The sets and costumes were designed by Jo Mielziner who was 32 at the time and went on to create the stage designs for more than three hundred plays and musicals, including the original productions of Death of a Salesman and Guys and Dolls. Although it is a two-act opera, the Met performed it without an interval for a total running time of one hour and fifteen minutes and presented it as the first half of a double bill with Leoncavallo's Pagliacci.

Despite the mixed reviews, The Emperor Jones enjoyed a fair amount of initial success and won Gruenberg the Bispham Memorial Medal Award for opera in English. It has continued to be performed into the 21st century (albeit rarely), long after the other American operas premiered in the Gatti-Casazza era had sunk into oblivion. The opera had fifteen performances over two seasons with the Met company which also took it on tour to Boston, Brooklyn, Hartford and Baltimore. Apart from the Met performances, it was also staged in Philadelphia, Chicago, Los Angeles, and San Francisco in 1933 with Tibbett in the title role and was revived again in Chicago in 1946. In Europe it was performed in Amsterdam in 1934 with Jules Bledsoe in the title role followed by performances in Brussels, Vienna, Milan, and London. The Teatro dell'Opera in Rome performed it in 1951, and Michigan Opera Theatre staged a major revival in 1979 with African American baritones Andrew Smith and David Arnold in the title role, conducted by Robert Willoughby Jones. After its last performance at the Metropolitan Opera House in February 1934, it was not seen again in New York City until 2001 when it was revived by a small company, Operaworks, in a 55-seat theatre using a digitized virtual orchestra in place of musicians with baritone Fredrick Redd in the title role. In 2009, the opera was revived in Italy for two performances at the Teatro delle Muse in Ancona with Nmon Ford in the title role and a full orchestra and chorus conducted by Bruno Bartoletti.

== Roles ==
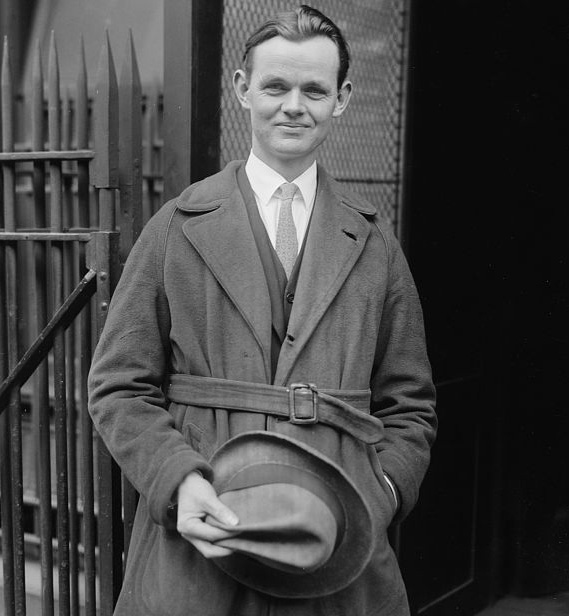
Lawrence Tibbett who created the title role of The Emperor Jones

Role	Voice type	Premiere Cast, January 7, 1933 (Conductor: Tullio Serafin)
Brutus Jones, Emperor Jones, a former Pullman porter and ex-convict	baritone	Lawrence Tibbett
Henry Smithers, a Cockney trader and Jones's underling	tenor	Marek Windheim
Native Woman	soprano	Pearl Besuner
Congo, The Witch Doctor (dancer)		Hemsley Winfield

== Synopsis ==
Setting: An unnamed island in the West Indies in the early part of the 20th century

Orchestral prelude

A chanting chorus calls for the death of Emperor Jones and an insistent drumbeat is heard in the distance.

=== Act 1 ===
Brutus Jones, an African American ex-Pullman porter, gambler, and escaped convict had stowed away from the United States to an island in the West Indies several years previously. There, he had set himself up as the island's Emperor and during that time made himself rich at the expense of the natives as well as earning a reputation as a cruel tyrant. He now sits in his "palace" in the final days of his reign. His underling, the cockney trader Smithers, tells Jones that the natives are planning a revolt against him. Full of bravado, Jones tells Smithers of the power which he has held over the island and that he has convinced the natives that he can only be killed by a silver bullet which he wears around his neck on a chain. Nevertheless, he tells Smithers that he is retiring as Emperor, has hidden supplies in the jungle, and plans make his escape to Martinique with all the money he has stolen from the islanders.

Orchestral interlude

Again a chanting chorus is heard

=== Act 2 ===
Jones lies exhausted in the jungle, unable to find any of the supplies he had hidden. As darkness falls, and the drumbeats become louder and more insistent, he is beset by hallucinations from his past life. When he sees a vision of the man he had murdered in a craps game, he starts running through the jungle, tearing off pieces of his uniform until he is left in rags. He then has visions of a convict gang with a guard, and a slave auction with the auctioneer calling Jones to the block. He fires his gun at the phantoms until he has used up all his bullets save the silver one he wears around his neck. In a moment of lucidity, he reflects on his past life and probable fate and sings a negro spiritual, "It's Me, O Lord, Standin' in de Need of Prayer". At dawn, he is still trying to find his way out of the jungle when a witch doctor appears. He grabs Jones and starts dancing wildly around him. When he is surrounded by the soldiers and natives who have been hunting him, Jones realizes that all is lost, puts the silver bullet into his gun, places the gun against his head and fires. Smithers stands over the dead Emperor and utters the final words of the opera: "Dead as an 'erring. Well, Gor blimey, yer died in a grand style any'ow." The curtain falls as the drumbeats fade and the natives carry off Jones's body. The opera plot parts from the O’Neill play in one significant detail: the play has Jones killed by the natives while in the opera he takes his own life.

== Recordings ==
There are no complete commercial recordings of The Emperor Jones. The most famous piece from the opera, "It's Me, O Lord, Standin' in de Need of Prayer", was recorded on 19 January 1934 by Lawrence Tibbett and released by RCA Victor (Victor 7959, CS 81087–2) shortly after the premiere. Tibbett's recording was later re-issued on LP by New World Records in Toward an American Opera 1911-1954. It appeared on CD in Lawrence Tibbett: From Broadway to Hollywood from the Nimbus Records Prima Voce series, on Souvenirs From American Operas from the International Record Collectors' Club, and on Lebendige Vergangenheit: Lawrence Tibbett. A recording of the same piece sung by George London appears on George London: Of Gods and Demons from the Sony Master Works series.

== See also ==
- List of premieres at the Metropolitan Opera

== Sources ==
- Ewen, David (1944/2007). "Gruenberg", Music for the Millions - The Encyclopedia of Musical Masterpieces. Read Books. ISBN 1-4067-3926-X (originally published in 1944 by Arco Publishing Company)
- Gauss, Rebecca B. (1994). "O'Neill, Gruenberg and The Emperor Jones". The Eugene O'Neill Review, Volume 18, Nos. 1 & 2, Spring/Fall 1994. ISSN 1040-9483
- Hipsher, Edward Ellsworth. American Opera and Its Composers. Theodore Presser Company (1934)
- Hurwitt, Elliott S. (2004) "New Negro Art Theater" in Cary D. Wintz, Paul Finkelman (eds.) Encyclopedia of the Harlem Renaissance, Vol. 2, p. 895. Routledge ISBN 1-57958-389-X
- Il Resto del Carlino (January 21, 2009). "Prima assoluta sul palco delle Muse, Venerdì arriva 'The emperor Jones'" (in Italian)
- Kirk, Elise Kuhl (2001). American Opera. University of Illinois Press. ISBN 0-252-02623-3
- Metropolitan Opera Archives. The Emperor Jones. MetOpera Database
- Nash, Joe (2001). "Pioneers in Negro Concert Dance 1931-1937". PBS
- Nettles, Darryl Glenn (2003). African American Concert Singers Before 1950. McFarland. ISBN 0-7864-1467-7
- Pegolotti, James A. (2003). Deems Taylor: A Biography. UPNE. ISBN 1-55553-587-9
- Shapiro, Marjorie Mackay (1994). "A Strange Case: Louis Gruenberg's Forgotten 'Great American Opera'—The Emperor Jones" in John Louis DiGaetani, Josef P. Sirefman (eds.) Opera and the Golden West: The Past, Present, and Future of Opera in the U.S.A., pp. 233–243. Fairleigh Dickinson University Press. ISBN 0-8386-3519-9
- Sturm, George (1981) "Look Back In Anger: The Strange Case Of Louis Gruenberg", MadAminA!. Music Associates of America
- Time Magazine (May 23, 1932). "Native Opera"
- Time Magazine (January 16, 1933). "O'Neill into Opera"
- Tommasini, Anthony (February 16, 2001). "The Emperor Jones". The New York Times
- The Eugene O'Neil Review (Spring/Fall 2000) Shafer, Yvonne. The Eugene O’Neill Review of "The Emperor Jones", vol. 24, no. 1/2, Penn State University Press, 2000, pp. 148–51, http://www.jstor.org/stable/29784694.
