= Fredrick Redd =

Operatic baritone and business executive

- Education: University of Texas at Austin; Rochester Institute of Technology
- Occupations: Operatic baritone, and businessman
- Years active: 1993-present

Fredrick Redd is an operatic baritone. Redd has performed in concert, opera, musical theatre, recitals, radio, television and film. As a lead baritone opera singer, he has performed over 20 roles including the Metropolitan Opera Guild, New York City Opera, Opera North, Opera Carolina, Connecticut Grand Opera, Teatro Grattacielo, New York Grand Opera, Harrisburg Opera, Verismo Opera, Piedmont Opera, and Houston Opera Ebony, among others.

In 2025, Fredrick became the Artistic Director of the William Warfield Vocal Competition for High School Students. He previously served an adjudicator for five years and is currently a Board Member with William Warfield Scholarship Fund. In 2025, Fredrick joined the Board of Directors for the State Opera of New Jersey.

As an educator, Redd was assistant professor of construction management from 1996 to 1999 at Utica College of Syracuse University (now Utica University). He was an adjunct faculty member at the New York University School of Continuing Education from 1993 to 1996 and at the University of Phoenix from 2014 to 2015.

As a business executive, he serves as Chief Business Development Officer and Vice President of Technical Services at PACO Group, Inc., where he leads strategic growth initiatives, technical service delivery, and infrastructure-focused consulting efforts in the public and private sectors. In 2025, Redd became a member of the Forbes Business Development Council, an invitation-only organization of senior business leaders. through this platform, he contributed 5 thought-leadership articles in 2025 published on Forbes.com

== Early life and education ==
Redd was born in Beaumont Texas, and six months later he moved with his family to Houston, Texas. He studied piano and trombone while attending the High School for Engineering Professions in Houston Texas. After graduating from high school, Redd went on to complete his bachelor’s degree in civil engineering from the University of Texas at Austin. Redd continued his musical studies at the Juilliard School and in Italy at the Accademia Chigiana and the Spoleto Vocal Institute. He then returned to the United States, and worked on his graduate architecture coursework at Syracuse University. Redd decided not complete his master’s degree in architecture and ultimately completed Master of Business Administration (MBA) from Rochester Institute of Technology.

== Career ==
Redd started his engineering career in Austin Texas and he moved to Princeton, New Jersey, to continue his engineering career. While there, he joined the chorus with Princeton Pro Musica that led him to start voice lessons. Moving to New York City, to continue vocal studies at the Juilliard School, he met Vincent La Selva, conductor of New York Grand Opera, who became his mentor and started his professional singing career in opera. In 2002, he made his New York City Opera debut in Lincoln as the Undertaker in Porgy & Bess as a part of the PBS Great Performances Series. One year later, he made his Carnegie Hall mainstage debut as the baritone soloist in Carmina Burana with the New England Symphonic Ensemble in a Mid America Production. In 2005, Redd returned to Carnegie Hall with New York Grand Opera to perform Giacomo in Verdi’s Giovanna D’Arco and again in 2006 as the baritone soloist in Beethoven’s Ninth Symphony.

Redd also has a career in business and has been a principal at North Highland Worldwide Consulting, where his work as an African-American in the arts was supported. He made Merkin Hall recital debut in 2012.

In 2019, Redd returned to Carnegie Hall as a soloist in Mark Hayes’ Te Deum In 2019, Redd returned to New York City Opera as featured artist in world premiere of Stonewall. In 2021, He portrayed the character of James in the world premiere of Martinsville 7 with Trilogy Opera in August 2021.

In 2022, Redd performed his first Wagner role as Wotan in Das Rheingold and debuted as Hark in the opera Nat Turner by Michael Raphael with the New Jersey Symphony. Redd returned to Carnegie Hall main stage performances on May 27, 28 and June 30 as soloist in Haydn's Creation, Mozart's Regina Coeli, and Hayes' Requiem. As invited, Redd sang in the 45th Annual Benefit Concert for the William Warfield Scholarship Fund and collaborated with Harold Danko, international jazz pianist and recording artist in singing "Ole Man River", one of Warfield's signature songs. In October 22, Redd starred as Dom Claude Frollo in the Hunchback of Notre Dame (Equity Off-Broadway) and performed excerpts from the title role in Rigoletto for the Metropolitan Opera Guild and their program series on The Verdi Baritone. In this series, Redd also covered the roles of Germont (La Traviata), Rodrigo (Don Carlo) and Amonasro (Aida). In the fall of 2022,Redd joined RIT's Advisory Board for the School of Performing Arts and also joined President David C. Munson's Roundtable of advisors.

In 2024, Redd returned to the main stage of Carnegie Hall as a soloist in the "Ballad of the Brown King" by Margaret Bonds with the New England Symphonic Ensemble. He also performed selections from Porgy and Bess as Porgy, Sportin' Life, and Jake with the Orchestra of the Southern Finger Lakes and gave a masterclass to aspiring singers the day before the concert. In April, Redd was a soloist with the Rochester Oratorio Society in the US premiere of "Freedom Song - When Gospel Came to the Empire" at the Fort Hill Performing Arts Center in Canandaigua. He reprised this performance in September 2024 in a recording and filming session of the work at the Sklarski Glass Box Theatre in Rochester, NY with the Rochester Oratorio Society and also hosted masterclass sessions in Rochester.

=== Reception ===
Redd’s concert work includes performances of over 20 classical oratorio works with orchestras. His television and film credits include Great Performances: Live from Lincoln Center: and New York City Opera’s production of Porgy and Bess.

His most recent review in 2022, as the menacing Dom Frollo in The Hunchback of Notre Dame, Leslie Sattler wrote:"While Fredrick Redd is very plainly a singer first and an actor second, he is a fine Frollo. His first act’s solo was the highlight of my viewing experience."

In 2000, Redd starred in the titular role in Emperor Jones opera by Louis Gruenberg. His performance received positive reviews, with Eugene O'Neil writing that "Director Patrick Casey was fortunate in his choice of Fredrick Redd as the central figure." Opera Now wrote that "Fredrick Redd was a powerful Jones, metamorphosing from a strutting Idi Amin type to a disintegrating wreck. The parlando vocal writing didn't give him much of a chance to soar, but he was a compelling vocal actor."

Redd starred as Renato in Un Ballo in Maschera performed in 2006. The Italian Voice reviewed his performance, writing "Renato (Riccardo's secretary and murderer), was masterfully sung by Fredrick Redd. His strong yet mellow baritone negotiated the dramatic, vengeful and poignant passages of Verdi with many memorable moments, among them his soulful singing of "Eri tu", towards the end of Act 2. Redd's voice challenged to the limit by this aria and he met the challenge by making us feel Renato's heartbreak earning him an ovation as well."

== Awards and honors ==
- 2025 - Trendsetters to Watch Award, Fueld Conference in Las Vegas
- 2023- Trailblazer and Exemplar Award, by the Port Authority of New York & New Jersey

== Selected publications/discography ==
- Estimating for Building Construction (1999)
- Film credit - Porgy & Bess
- CD credit - Contemporary Chamber Art-Fink: CD 0685 (BAR 0 89658 06852 5)Morning Sky RUSSO, Three Songs for baritone, clarinet, cello & piano My Star, Nightingails, The First Day sung by Fredrick Redd, baritone/John Russo, clarinet/Stephen Framil, cello/Mary Jo Pena.
