= Louis Gruenberg =

American pianist (1884–1964)

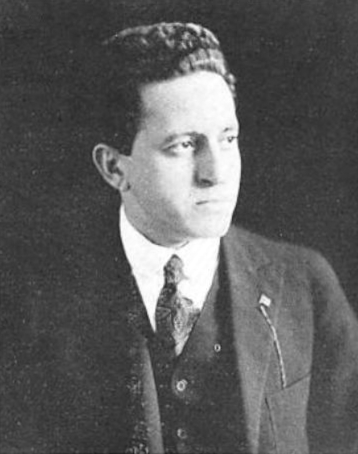
- Born: August 3, 1884; Brest-Litovsk, Russian Empire
- Died: June 9, 1964 (aged 79); Los Angeles, California, US
- Burial place: Westwood Memorial Cemetery
- Occupations: Pianist, composer

Louis Gruenberg (/ˈɡruːənbɜːrɡ/ GROO-ən-burg; August 3, 1884 [O.S. July 22] – June 9, 1964) was a Russian-born American pianist and prolific composer, especially of operas. An early champion of Schoenberg and other contemporary composers, he was also a highly respected Oscar-nominated film composer in Hollywood in the 1940s.

== Life and career ==
Louis Theodor Gruenberg was born near Brest-Litovsk (now in Belarus but then in Russia), to Abe Gruenberg and Klara Kantarovitch. His family emigrated to the United States when he was a few months old. His father worked as a violinist in New York City. Young Louis had a talent for the piano, and by the age of eight Gruenberg was taking piano lessons with Adele Margulies at the National Conservatory in New York (then headed by Antonín Dvořák).

Gruenberg played both solo concerts and in ensembles from the beginning, and in his early twenties he went to study in Europe with Ferruccio Busoni at the Vienna Conservatory. Before World War I, Gruenberg taught students and toured, both as an accompanist and soloist.

In 1919, Gruenberg wrote The Hill of Dreams for orchestra, which gained him the highly acclaimed Flagler Prize and enabled him to devote himself more completely to composition. As Gruenberg began to make his mark as a composer, he showed his fascination with jazz, composing works with strong jazz and ragtime influences.

He joined the International Composers' Guild (ICG which had been founded by Edgard Varèse and Carlos Salzedo in 1921. on 19 February 1922 the ICG scheduled the first of their first series of concerts in Greenwich Village Theatre. Gruenberg's Polychromatics received its world premiere that night. Then, on February 4, 1923, Gruenberg conducted the American premiere of Pierrot Lunaire by Arnold Schoenberg at the Klaw Theatrein another concert organised by the ICG. Shortly after this performance, he and other members of the league left over disagreements with Varèse and formed the League of Composers.

In its 1933 season, the Metropolitan Opera premiered his expressionistic opera The Emperor Jones, based on the major experimental the play by Eugene O'Neill which had already triumphed on Broadway with Paul Robeson playing the title role of an African-American who declares himself emperor on a Caribbean island. In the opera, the title role was created by baritone Lawrence Tibbett, performing in blackface. It was performed at the Met for the 1934 season as well, and featured on the cover of Time Magazine receiving much critical acclaim.

Paul Robeson's 1936 film Song of Freedom also features a scene from the opera with Robeson singing the role of Jones. (This has sometimes resulted in a confusion that the 1933 film of O'Neill's play is a film of the opera.)

Between 1933 and 1936, Gruenberg headed the composition department of Chicago Musical College (now part of Roosevelt University). He collaborated with a man nicknamed "Roosevelt's filmmaker", Pare Lorentz to create The Fight for Life, a semi-documentary film about childbirth in Chicago slums, on which John Steinbeck also collaborated.

In 1937, he moved with his family to Beverly Hills, California, where fellow League members Arnold Schoenberg and Igor Stravinsky also now lived (though they never spoke). There he worked at merging music with visual media and film, and also composed for Hollywood films.

== Film composer ==
Gruenberg worked on the musical scoring for John Ford's masterpiece Stagecoach (1939), incorporating folk songs. The four other composers who worked with him are named on the Academy Award Stagecoach won for Best Music Scoring that year, but Gruenberg is not on the list of nominees. He heads the list of the five-man team who worked on the score in the official credits, and was soon well known in the industry as having worked on Stagecoach's Oscar-winning score.

Gruenberg soon composed an original film score under his sole credit for So Ends Our Night (1941) adapted from famous German exile Remarque's fourth novel, starring Oscar-winner Fredric March, Margaret Sullavan and Glenn Ford as exiles whom Nazi Germany's rise have rendered stateless. Due to his familiarity with the Vienna in which much of the film is set, Gruenberg composed source music, a homage to the world of Austrian and German music he had grown up in, now under Nazi control. Gruenberg was nominated for the Academy Award for Best Original Score.

In 1942, Gruenberg was again nominated for his next film, along with Columbia's head of music, Morris Stoloff, for Best Dramatic Score for Commandos Strike at Dawn (1942), directed by John Farrow and starring Paul Muni in a story of a secret Allied attack on the Nazi-occupied Norwegian coast. Originally, Stoloff had convinced his boss, Harry Cohn, to hire Stravinsky for this job, since the Russian genius happened to be sitting out the war in Los Angeles. Stravinsky's wife, Vera, discovered some Norwegian folk songs in a used LA book shop, and Stravinsky set to work adapting these with his usual speed. When the prolific composer finished his score before a single frame of film had been shot; Stoloff ruefully paid Stravinsky and gave the work back. Months later, Stoloff brought Gruenburg on to compose to the completed film, as was the usual practice. Stravinsky, never one to let work go to waste, refashioned his unused score into "Four Norwegian Moods", and Gruenberg was nominated for another Oscar.

His next film job, An American Romance, was a heart-breaking failure for its director, King Vidor, a $3 million Technicolor tale of a steel industrialist that nobody saw; an uncredited composer was brought in to patch up the half-hour that was lopped out of it after its first screenings, before it lost a million dollars. It ended director King Vidor's long career at MGM.

== Gruenberg violin concerto ==
In 1944, the virtuoso violinist, Jascha Heifetz, commissioned and premiered Gruenberg's Violin Concerto, Op. 47 with Eugene Ormandy and the Philadelphia Orchestra, and recorded it with Pierre Monteux and the San Francisco Symphony Orchestra in 1945. The concerto is a lively work in three movements (Rhapsodie - With simplicity and warmth - Lively and with good humour), and lasts 38 minutes (in Heifetz's performance). Originally recorded for RCA Victor on shellac 78 RPM discs, it is considered a legendary performance of the master at the height of his powers, and is frequently re-issued on LP paired with Heifetz's 1937 recording of the Prokofiev Violin Concerto. As one of that conductor's earliest recordings, it can also be found in the collected works of Pierre Monteux, re-issued by Sony Classics.

== Postwar film composing ==
Back on the payroll in LA, Gruenberg was brought in to score the taut, well-received one-room drama of a Russian soldier holding a group of German soldiers, Counter-Attack (1945), written by soon-to-be-blacklisted John Howard Lawson. His next score was for a blacklisted writer who was already working without credit, Dalton Trumbo, in a low-budget film noir, The Gangster (1947). Arch of Triumph (aka Arc of Triumph) (1948) based on Erich Remarque's fifth novel, revisited suffering refugees, with Charles Boyer, Ingrid Bergman and Charles Laughton as a Nazi-in-hiding. Another prestigious flop, it cost $5 million to make but made less than a million at the box office. No one, it seemed, wanted to revisit a Paris where the Nazis had yet to be beaten.

All The King's Men (1949), the Pulitzer-Prize-winning fictional story of Huey Long, was a tremendous success, winning three top Oscars among many other prizes. Louis Gruenberg was nominated for Best Score in the newly minted Golden Globe Awards. Gruenberg's last Hollywood score was for Mickey Rooney and Peter Lorre in the film noir Quicksand (1950), directed by veteran Irving Pichel, and considered by many to be the adult Rooney's best work. Again, the orchestral opening under the credits has a powerful use of brass, and as Rooney descends into his life of petty crime, a sinewy jazz score emerges.

== Later years ==
Louis Gruenberg's film composing career stops in 1950, and it seems a fair premise that, having worked with blacklisted writers (Trumbo and Lawsen), blacklisted directors (Irving Pichel and John Cromwell), and left-wing tainted actors (Ingrid Bergman, Fredric March), he either abandoned Hollywood at this moment in American cinema history or was abandoned by it. There is very little information on the impact of the blacklist on film composers, who tend to be overlooked in the best of times, and 1950 was not the best of times.

During the last twenty years of his life, Gruenberg also became increasingly isolated from the concert music world. He did maintain a close friendship with Arnold Schoenberg, by now a permanent resident of Los Angeles as well as a music professor at UCLA, until the latter's death in 1951.

Louis Gruenberg composed continually until his death, which took place at Cedars of Lebanon Hospital in Los Angeles on June 9, 1964. He was buried at Westwood Memorial Cemetery. Besides other works, he wrote five symphonies, four full length operas (Volpone, Jack and the Beanstalk, Antony and Cleopatra and The Dumb Wife) and the lengthy oratorio A Song of Faith.

== Rediscovery ==
The violinist Koh Gabriel Kameda reintroduced the almost forgotten concerto to the public with a premiere of the work in Japan in 2002 with the New Japan Philharmonic under the direction of Gerard Schwarz. He was the first violinist who has ever played the concerto after Heifetz. In 2009 Kameda made another premiere of the concerto in Mexico with the Philharmonic Orchestra of Mexico City under Edwin Outwater.

== Works ==
=== Operas ===
- The Bride of the Gods, libretto by Busoni, translated by C. H. Meltzer (1913)
- The Dumb Wife, libretto after The Man Who Married a Dumb Wife by Anatole France after Rabelais (1923)
- Jack and the Beanstalk, libretto by John Erskine (1931)
- The Emperor Jones, libretto by the composer (working alone), after a play by Eugene O'Neill (1931)
- Witch of Brocken, with J. Lilian Vandevere and Emil Ferdinand Malkowsky (1931)
- Queen Helen (1936)
- Green Mansions (radio opera), libretto after a novel by William Henry Hudson (1937)
- Helena's Husband, libretto by P. Moeller (1938)
- Volpone, libretto by the composer after Ben Jonson (1945)
- One Night of Cleopatra, libretto by the composer after T. Gautier
- The Delicate King, libretto by the composer after Alexandre Dumas, père (1955)
- Antony and Cleopatra, libretto by the composer after Shakespeare (1955)

=== Orchestral ===
- The Hill of Dreams, 1919
- The Daniel Jazz, 1925
- Concerto for Violin and Orchestra, Op. 47, 1944
- 5 symphonies

=== Piano ===
- Jazzberries op.25
- Jazz Masks op.30A
- Six Jazz Epigrams op.30B
- Polychomatics op.16

=== Films ===
- The Fight for Life, 1940
- Stagecoach, 1939. (uncredited Academy Award for best music scoring, 1940)
- So Ends Our Night, 1941 (Nominated for Academy Award for Best Dramatic Score, 1942)
- Commandos Strike at Dawn, 1942 (Nominated for Academy Award for Best Dramatic Score, 1943)
- The Nazis Strike Documentary Short, 1943
- An American Romance, 1944
- Counter-Attack, 1945
- The Gangster, 1947
- Arch of Triumph, 1948
- Smart Woman, 1948
- All the King's Men, 1949. (Golden Globe nomination for Best Score, 1950)
- Quicksand, 1950
