= Lawrence Tibbett =

American opera singer (1896–1960)

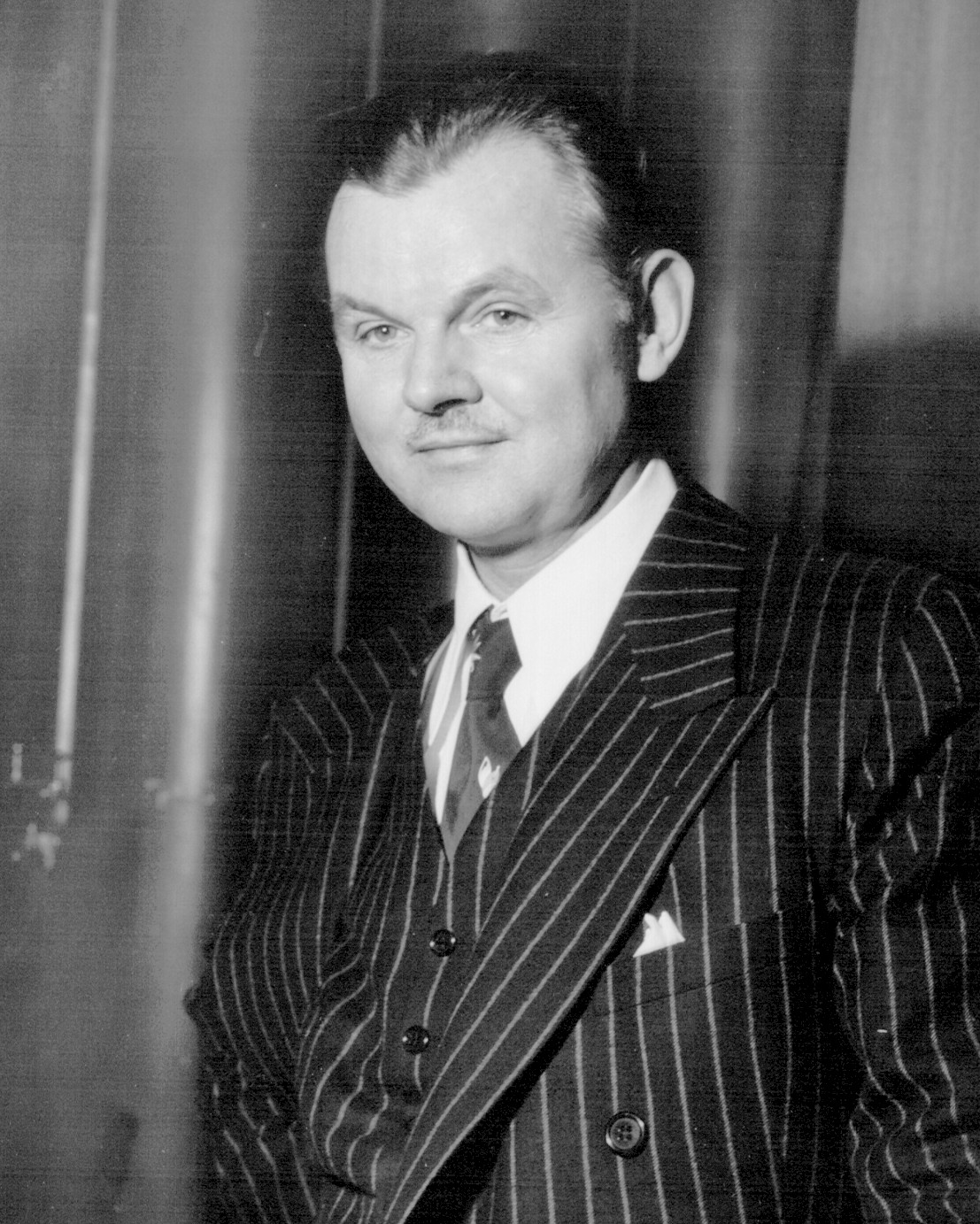
- Tibbett in 1943
- Born: Lawrence Mervil Tibbet; November 16, 1896; Bakersfield, California, U.S.
- Died: July 15, 1960 (aged 63); New York City, U.S.
- Occupations: Opera singer Actor; Radio personality
- Spouses: Grace MacKay Smith; Jane Marston (m. 1932)
- Children: 3

Lawrence Tibbett in 1930

Lawrence Mervil Tibbett (November 16, 1896 – July 15, 1960) was an American opera singer and recording artist who also performed as a film actor and radio personality. A baritone with large, deep, and dark-timbred voice, his dynamic range could range from forceful fortes to delicate pianissimos. He sang leading roles with the Metropolitan Opera in New York City more than 600 times from 1923 to 1950. He performed diverse musical theatre roles, including Captain Hook in Peter Pan in a touring show.

== Biography ==
Lawrence Tibbett was born Lawrence Mervil Tibbet (with a single final "t") on November 16, 1896, in Bakersfield, California. His father was a part-time deputy sheriff, killed in a shootout with outlaw Jim McKinney in 1903. Tibbett grew up in Los Angeles, earning money by singing in church choirs and at funerals. He graduated from Manual Arts High School in 1915. A year later, he met his future wife, Grace Mackay Smith, who rented a room in his mother's house. During World War I, he served in the Merchant Marine, after which he found employment singing as prologue to silent movies at the Grauman "Million Dollar" Theater in downtown Los Angeles.

Tibbett studied in New York City with Frank La Forge and in 1923 at the age of 26, he signed his first contract, for $60 per week, with the Metropolitan Opera, using the name "Tibbett". The Met mistakenly added the extra "t" to his last name on his contract and he decided to keep the new spelling.

His Met roles included Valentin in Charles Gounod's Faust, Silvio and later Tonio in Ruggero Leoncavallo's Pagliacci, and the King's Herald in Richard Wagner's Lohengrin. He first achieved national recognition playing Ford in Giuseppe Verdi's Falstaff. Tibbett traveled to California in 1927 to sing the lead role in the Grove Play St. Francis of Assisi, and it was during that trip to San Francisco when he met ex-New Yorker Jennie Marston Burgard (daughter of New York banker Edgar L. Marston), whom he married in 1932. During the 1930s, Tibbett toured Europe and Australia, performing on stage or giving recitals in London, Paris, Prague and Vienna as well as in Sydney and Melbourne.

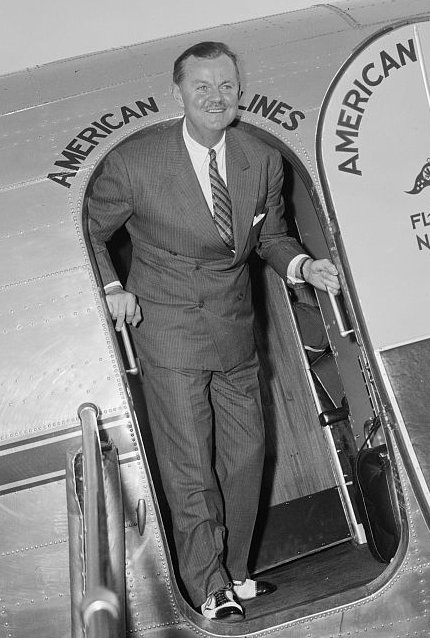
Tibbett in 1939

Tibbett made his first recordings for the Victor Talking Machine Company in 1926. He recorded exclusively for Victor/RCA Victor for his entire career. In the early 1930s, Tibbett also appeared in movies, after getting his start at Neely Dickson's Hollywood Community Theater. His sojourn in Hollywood proved brief, although he was nominated for the Academy Award for Best Actor for his first film, The Rogue Song, a 1930 Metro-Goldwyn-Mayer production with Laurel and Hardy, shot in two-color Technicolor (only a few minutes of footage of the film, as well as the complete soundtrack, is known to survive today). Soon after, he starred in another MGM musical film, New Moon, opposite Grace Moore and The Cuban Love Song (1931), with Lupe Vélez. In 1935, he appeared in Metropolitan for 20th Century-Fox. This film is notable for its extensive segments of Tibbett's performing operatic arias in a stage setting. He also starred in the film The Prodigal in 1931 with Esther Ralston and Roland Young in which he sings "Without a Song." His final film was Under Your Spell in 1936. Also during the 1930s, Tibbett had a domestic radio program sponsored by the Packard Motor Car Company of America on which he sang formal music. The company chose him to announce the Packard 120 to the world on air; he drove one. When the firm wanted to sell less expensive cars, they persuaded him to add popular tunes to his repertoire in order to boost sales. He also appeared on Your Hit Parade.

In 1936, with violinist Jascha Heifetz, he founded the American Guild of Musical Artists, a labor union for solo performing artists. He was the guild's proactive president for 17 years.

In January 1937, during a rehearsal onstage at the Met for Richard Hageman's opera Caponsacchi, Tibbett accidentally stabbed a long-time member of the chorus, Joseph Sterzini, during a fight scene, causing a small wound in Sterzini's hand. Sterzini, who suffered from high blood pressure, died later that day.

After his operatic career concluded, Tibbett performed in musicals and plays in the early 1950s. He spent a summer in stock as the Reverend Davidson in Rain and played Captain Hook in a short-lived tour of the John Burrell staging of Peter Pan that was mounted for Jean Arthur and featured a musical score by the young Leonard Bernstein. Veronica Lake played Peter. Most notably, Tibbett took over the Italian operatic bass Ezio Pinza's role in Fanny during its original run on Broadway.

== Later years and death ==
In later years Tibbett served as host of a radio show featuring historic recordings of operatic singers. He leavened matters with reminiscences of his own stage experiences. Suffering from severe arthritis and years of heavy drinking, he aged prematurely as his health worsened. He died on July 15, 1960, after hitting his head on a table during a fall in his apartment. The Time obituary said of him: "Tibbett had a big, bronzelike, dramatically eloquent voice that combined ringing power with remarkable agility ... he left behind not only the echoes of a great voice but the memory of a performer who could feel equally at home with high art and popular entertainment, suggesting that there is a magical link between the two." He is interred at Forest Lawn Memorial Park in Glendale, California.

Tibbett's operatic recordings made in the United States for the Victor Talking Machine Company/RCA Victor during the 1920s and 1930s are regarded as among the better performances of this period. Many of these recordings are available on LP and CD re-issues. Dear Rogue: A Biography of the American Baritone Lawrence Tibbett, a comprehensive story of his personal life and musical career, by Hertzel Weinstat and Bert Wechsler, was published in 1996 by Amadeus Press of Portland, Oregon.

== Famous roles ==
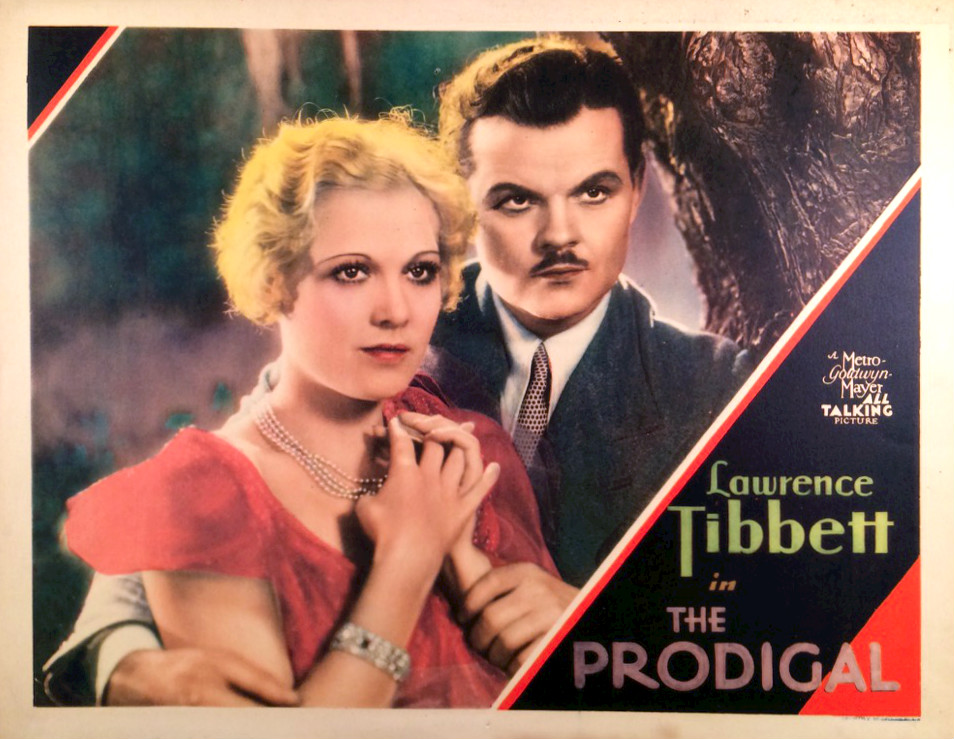
Lobby card for 1931 film The Prodigal with Esther Ralston

Although he gained praise for his acting performances, Tibbett's reputation at the Metropolitan Opera as a baritone was based primarily on his voice. His voice was large, with a dark timbre approaching that of a bass, and in his prime he used a wide range of dynamics, from full fortissimos and soft pianissimos. He was known for his performances of leads in many Verdi operas, including Ford in Falstaff, the title role in Simon Boccanegra, Iago in Otello, and Scarpia in Tosca , as well as for his performances as Escamillo in Carmen, and Tonio in i Pagliacci.

In addition, Tibbett created leading roles in a number of American operas, including Louis Gruenberg's The Emperor Jones, based on Eugene O'Neill's play. (He sang this in blackface; the character of Brutus Jones is an African-American). He starred in Howard Hanson's Merry Mount, as well as The King's Henchman and Peter Ibbetson, operas by Deems Taylor. Tibbett performed the roles of Porgy and Jake in the first album of selections from George Gershwin's Porgy and Bess, two roles which, on stage, usually are performed by black singers. Gershwin was present at the recording sessions. Continuing in this vein, Tibbett made a recording of Jerome Kern and Oscar Hammerstein II's song Ol' Man River from Show Boat.

Marston Records released a 10-CD set of Tibbett's recordings in March 2024.

== Awards and portrayals ==
- Lawrence Tibbett was pictured on a set of United States postage stamps in the "Legends of American Music series", celebrating opera singers.
- The year he died, Tibbett was made a posthumous member of the charter class of honorees in the Hollywood Walk of Fame. His star is located at 6300 Hollywood Boulevard, recognizing his contributions to the music industry. Though he was a pioneer in musical film, his star honors him as a recording artist.
- Tibbett, who had let his Beverly Hills home to mobster Bugsy Siegel at the time Siegel was shot to death on June 20, 1947, is portrayed briefly as a character in the 1991 film Bugsy, although the actor portraying him was shorter and pudgier than the real person.
- A full-length biography of Tibbett, titled Dear Rogue by Hertzel Weinstat and Bert Wechsler, was published in 1996.
