= Soichi Sunami =

Japanese-American photographer (1885–1971)

- Sunami Sōichi (角南 壮一)
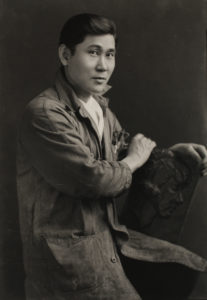
- Soichi Sunami
- Born: February 18, 1885; Okayama Prefecture, Japan
- Died: November 12, 1971 (aged 86); New York City, USA
- Occupation: Photographer
- Spouse: Suyeko Matsushima Sunami (married 1945–1971)
- Children: John Soichi Sunami and Reiko Sunami Kopelson

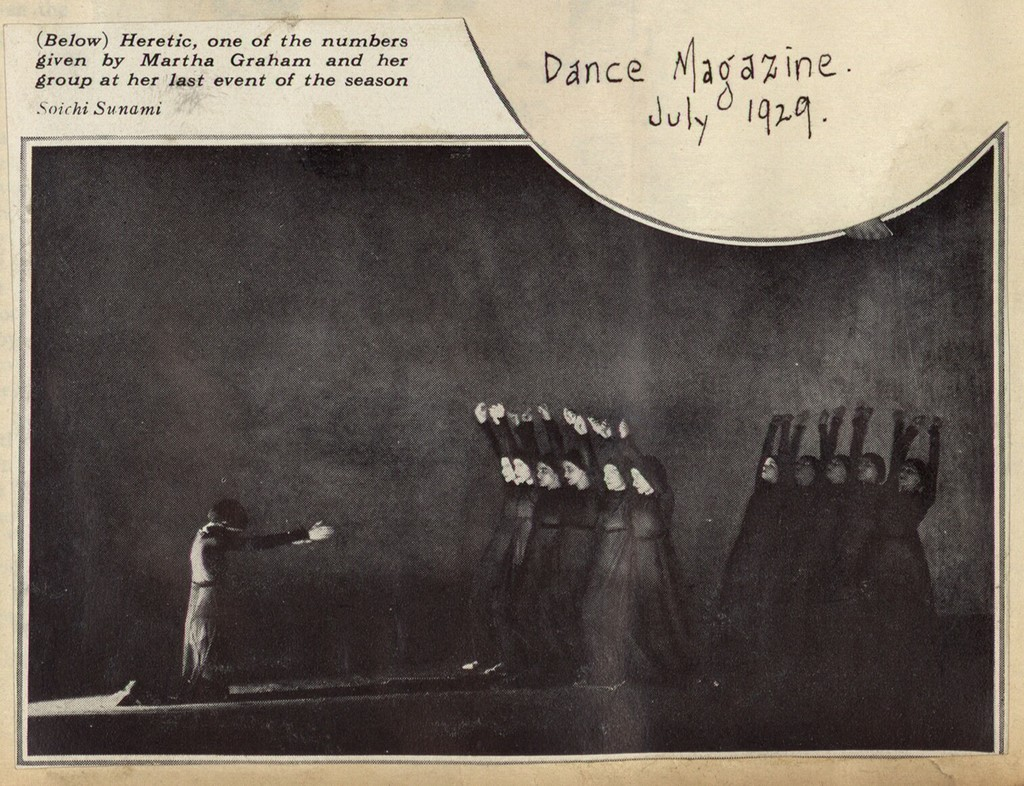
Martha Graham's "Heretic" by Soichi Sunami

Stefan Hirsch by Soichi Sunami

Soichi Sunami (角南 壮一 Sunami Sōichi, given name translating as "magnificent first son," and family name translating as "south corner"; 1885–1971) was a Japanese and American modernist photographer, influenced by the pictorialist movement, and best known for his portraits of early modern dancers, including Ruth St Denis, Agnes De Mille, Helen Tamiris and Martha Graham, with whom he maintained an extended artistic collaboration. He produced some of the only known images of the early black modern dancer, Edna Guy, and also photographed the modern dancer Harald Kreutzberg.

== Biography ==
Born in Okayama Prefecture, Japan, on February 18, 1885, he emigrated to the United States in 1905. In 1907 he arrived in Seattle, where he studied under Dutch impressionist painter Fokko Tadama. By 1918, he had shifted his artistic focus to photography after working alongside Wayne Albee and Frank Kunishige for photographer Ella E. McBride, the last two of whom were fellow members of the Seattle Camera Club, an association largely made up of Japanese-American immigrant photographers. He also won several awards from an art salon hosted by Frederick & Nelson, a local department store. By 1922, he had moved to New York City, where he briefly worked for photographer Nickolas Muray before enrolling at the Art Students League, alongside classmate Alexander Calder, under the primary tutelage of Ashcan painter John Sloan, after whom he would later name his son. It was in New York that he made the acquaintance of the author Anaïs Nin, and thereafter produced many of the photographs of her included in her books.

For nearly forty years (from 1930 until 1968) he was the main archival photographer at the Museum of Modern Art (MoMA) in New York City, a position that helped him avoid internment during World War II. His friends and admirers included artist Natalie Hays Hammond and MoMA founder Abby Aldrich Rockefeller. He became an American citizen on August 5, 1957, and died on November 12, 1971. Several members of his family followed him into the arts, including son John Soichi Sunami (a public artist), his son-in-law Robert Kopelson (pianist), his granddaughter Julia Kopelson (photographer), his granddaughter Jennifer Sunami (graphic design), his grandson Christopher Andrew-Soichi Sunami (organizer of the Columbus Invitational Arts Competition), and his granddaughter-in-law April Sunami (painter).

== Exhibitions and Public Collections ==
Starting on October 11, 2018, Cascadia Art Museum of Edmonds, Washington, staged "Invocation of Beauty: The Life and Photography of Soichi Sunami," one of the first major retrospectives of Sunami's work since his death. It was accompanied by a new book by art historian David F. Martin. Starting on November 30, 2018, a second retrospective of Sunami's work took place at the Cultural Arts Center in Columbus, Ohio, as part of "Generations of Art: The Sunami Family," a group show also featuring work by Sunami family members John, Jennifer and April, and great-grandson River Soichi Sunami. The opening reception also featured a rare, authorized recreation of an original Graham dance, Heretic, as performed by the Columbus Modern Dance Company, as well as music by grandson Christopher (as performed by musicians from the Columbus Symphony Orchestra).

Sunami photographs are found in the collections of the National Gallery of Art, the Getty, The Morgan Library & Museum, the Library of Congress, and the New York Public Library.
