= Ella E. McBride =

American photographer (1862–1965)

Ella Etna McBride
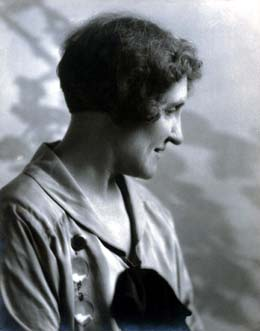
- Ella McBride by Wayne Albee, ca 1921
- Born: November 17, 1862; Albia, Iowa
- Died: September 14, 1965 (aged 102)
- Known for: Photography

Ella Etna McBride (November 17, 1862 – September 14, 1965) was an American fine-art photographer, mountain climber, and centenarian known for her career achievements after age sixty. In addition to running her own photography studio for over thirty years, she also spent eight years running the photography studio of Edward S. Curtis.

She was a member of the Seattle Camera Club and an early mentor of Japanese-American photographers Frank Kunishige and Soichi Sunami.

== Personal life ==
=== Early years ===
Ella E. McBride was born on November 17, 1862, in Albia, Iowa, to Samuel B. McBride and America McIntire McBride. In 1865, the family of five traveled via the Isthmus of Panama to Oregon. In 1882, McBride graduated high school.

=== Mountain climber ===
McBride began climbing mountains on the west coast. She began with Mount Hood and climbed more than thirty-six more major mountains over her life. She joined Mazamas, a mountaineering organization in Portland in 1896. She was the group's secretary and historian from 1896 to 1898. She met Edward S. Curtis, a photographer and Mazamas member, during a climb he led up Mount Rainier in 1897. Edgar McClure died during the descent after losing his footing; he had been gathering information to calculate Rainier's height. Curtis respected her independent mountain climbing ability and she assisted him on other climbs. The August 26, 1899, issue of Harper's Weekly reported on her trek with the Mazamas in the North Cascades up Sahale Mountain.

== Career ==
=== Education ===
In 1889, after receiving her teaching certificate, McBride taught in Portland, Oregon, schools. In 1894, she became the principal of the Ainsworth School, a position she held for 13 years.

=== Photography ===
McBride moved to Seattle, Washington by 1907 to work in the Curtis Studio. She managed the office and worked in the showroom and darkroom. In 1909, she operated his booth at the Alaska–Yukon–Pacific Exposition.

She opened her own studio in 1916 and the following year Edmund Schwinke joined McBride as a partner. In 1918, Wayne Albee joined the studio as chief photographer and a partner. He was assisted by Soichi Sunami and Frank Kunishige. Albee was a source of inspiration for McBride's photography, she was particularly interested in floral fine art works beginning in 1920. The studio's images were produced in local publications, including the Town Crier magazine. It photographed musicians and dancers at the Cornish School of the Arts. McBride's work was "firmly in the Pictorialist school", as opposed to the "Modernist sharp-focus documentary style" that was prevalent after the 1920s, and thus her work became less popular over time.

She was the only Caucasian and only woman who exhibited at the North American Times Exhibition of Pictorial Photographs in 1921. She won honorable mention for three of the floral photographs she exhibited at the Frederick & Nelson Salon. In 1922, she exhibited at a Royal Photographic Society of Great Britain competition. There were only 154 works selected out of thousands submitted. Three floral photographs of twelve accepted by American photographers were taken by McBride. McBride exhibited eight photographs in 1922 at the Frederick & Nelson Salon. It includes a portrait of Kunishige, other figure studies, landscapes and the floral still-life, Life & Death. She exhibited at F&N in 1923 and 1925. Her interest in Japanese art is evident in her A Shirley Poppy and Dogwood works.

McBride was an early member of the Seattle Camera Club, which stated that she was among the world's most exhibited photographers. Her works included floral and figure studies of artists and dancers. Her works were published in the Royal Photographic Society, American Photography and other magazines in the United States and abroad. Full-page illustrations of her photographs were shown in the American Annual of Photography in 1927 and 1928.

Her work was exhibited at the First International Photographic Salon of Japan in May 1927 and then solo exhibitions. In August, 30 of her prints were shown at the California Camera Club in San Francisco and in November at the Portage Camera Club in Akron, Ohio. Another solo exhibition was held in January 1931 at the Art Institute of Seattle. Her works were exhibited internationally in Paris, London, Stockholm, Liverpool, Edinburgh, Toronto, Turin, Vancouver, and Budapest. Within the United States, besides Seattle, her works were shown in New York, Chicago, Rochester, Syracuse, Cleveland, Akron, and Portland. Her exhibitions were concentrated over a 10-year period, during which she was the sixth most exhibited Pictorialist photographer in the world in 1926 to 1927. She stopped exhibiting at the beginning of the Depression.

In 1925, McBride cofounded the women's Seattle Metropolitan Soroptimist Club, which she was a member and officer for almost 40 years. She focused most of her effort on her studio during the Depression. Albee had moved to California about 1930 and in 1932 she took on a new partner, commercial photographer Richard H. Anderson, who particularly took images of children. From then until the 1960s, it was one of the leading studios in Seattle. They were located in the Loveless Studio building. Her eyesight began to fail and at the age of 91, she retired.

Her work is documented in the book Captive Light: The Life and Photography of Ella E. McBride by Margaret E. Bullock and David F. Martin.

== Death ==
McBride died at 102 years and 10 months of age on September 14, 1965, when she was still vital and clear-minded. Some of her negatives from 1917 to the 1950s are at the Seattle's Museum of History & Industry (MOHAI); others were destroyed. Fifteen photographs taken by McBride or her studio are among the collection of the University of Washington Libraries. They include studio portraits, such as poet Don Blanding, and images of the University of Washington campus.

== Collections ==
McBride's works are included in the collections of:

- Los Angeles County Museum of Art
- Minneapolis Institute of Arts
- Museum of History & Industry (MOHAI), Seattle
- Nora Eccles Harrison Museum of Art, Logan, Utah.
- Seattle Art Museum
- Tacoma Art Museum
