= Bob H. Suzuki =

American engineer and university administrator (1936–2024)

- Born: January 2, 1936; Portland, Oregon, U.S.
- Died: May 1, 2024 (aged 88)
- Education: University of California, Berkeley (BS, MS); California Institute of Technology (PhD)
- Occupations: Engineer, educator, university administrator
- Known for: President of California State Polytechnic University, Pomona (1991–2003)
- Spouse: Agnes Suzuki
- Children: 3

Bob H. Suzuki (January 2, 1936 – May 1, 2024) was an American educator and university administrator. He served as president of California State Polytechnic University, Pomona from 1991 to 2003. His work focused on access to higher education and programs for students from underrepresented groups.

== Early life and education ==
Suzuki was born on January 2, 1936, in Portland, Oregon. His parents were immigrants from Japan. During World War II, he was confined with his family at the Minidoka internment camp in Idaho. After the war, his family moved to an area near Spokane, Washington.

Suzuki attended the University of California, Berkeley, where he received a Bachelor of Science degree in 1960 and a Master of Science degree in mechanical engineering in 1962. He earned a PhD in aeronautics from the California Institute of Technology in 1967.

== Career ==
Suzuki worked as a research engineer at Boeing in Seattle, Washington. He later taught at the University of Massachusetts, Amherst and at the University of Southern California.

In the 1960s, Suzuki moved from engineering to education. He studied issues of access and equity in higher education. He wrote and spoke about Asian American students and the model minority myth.

During this period, Suzuki participated in efforts to repeal the Emergency Detention Act of 1950. He also chaired the National Education Commission of the Japanese American Citizens League and served as vice chair of the Community Advisory Committee overseeing the desegregation of Pasadena's public schools.

He worked as dean of graduate studies and research at California State University, Los Angeles from 1981 to 1985. He then was appointed as vice president for academic affairs at California State University, Northridge where he worked from 1985 to 1991.

Suzuki became president of California State Polytechnic University, Pomona (CPP) in 1991, where he worked until his retirement in 2003.

== Criticism ==
While president of CPP, Suzuki was investigated by the CSU Chancellor's Office for financial irregularities related to his housing allowance. CSU officials later said that additional documents indicated there was no problem with Suzuki's housing allowance. A subsequent audit found personnel and policy violations in two university offices and recommended tighter financial controls, although it described the violations as isolated incidents.

In 1998, CPP faculty approved a vote of no confidence in Suzuki. Faculty critics objected to his spending practices and management style.

== Honors and awards ==
- National Education Association Human Rights Award for Leadership in Asian and Pacific Island Affairs (1976).
- San Gabriel Valley Economic Partnership Technology Leadership Award (2001)
- Order of the Rising Sun (2003)
- American Council on Education Reginald Wilson Diversity Leadership Award (2011)
- Association for Asian American Studies Lifetime Achievement Award (2013)

== Personal life and death ==
Suzuki was married to Agnes Suzuki, and together they had three children. He died on May 1, 2024, at the age of 88.
