= David F. Martin =

American art historian

David F. Martin is an art historian with a primary focus on female, gay or Asian-American artists. He is an authority on the art of Washington State during the period 1890-1960, and in particular on members of the Seattle Camera Club, and chiefly composed of Japanese American photographers working in the Pictorialist style.

== Career ==
Martin has been the consulting curator for the Cascadia Art Museum in Edmonds, Washington since 2015. He has previously served as Program Director for the American Art Council at the Seattle Art Museum and as regional President of the Northwest Chapter of the National Museum of Women in the Arts, Washington, D.C. He is the only male Honorary Member of Women Painters of Washington. He has been instrumental in recovering the artistic legacies of Washington State artists Virna Haffer and Soichi Sunami, among others.

== Bibliography ==
Books he has authored or co-authored include:

- Martin, David F; Bromberg, Nicolette; University of Washington; Libraries; Henry Art Gallery (2011). Shadows of a fleeting world: pictorial photography and the Seattle Camera Club. Seattle, WA: University of Washington Press. ISBN 9780295990859. OCLC 663459066.
- Martin, David F; Cascadia Art Museum (2017). Territorial hues: the color print and Washington state, 1920-1960. Cascadia Art Museum. ISBN 9780998911205. OCLC 1018230996.
- Martin, David F; Whatcom Museum (2011). Evergreen muse: the art of Elizabeth Colborne. Bellingham, WA: Whatcom Museum. ISBN 9780295991429. OCLC 714722651.
- Bullock, Margaret E; Henderson, Christina S; Martin, David F; Haffer, Virna; Tacoma Art Museum; Exhibition A Turbulent Lens: the Photographic Art of Virna Haffer; Exhibition A Turbulent Lens: the Photographic Art of Virna Haffer (2011). A turbulent lens the photographic art of Virna Haffer. Tacoma: Tacoma Art Museum. ISBN 9780924335327. OCLC 935175566.
- Martin, David F; Bullock, Margaret E; Helder, Z. Vanessa; Tacoma Art Museum (2014). Austere beauty: the art of Z. Vanessa Helder. Tacoma Art Museum. ISBN 9780924335396. OCLC 874118734.
- BULLOCK, MARGARET E (2018). CAPTIVE LIGHT: the life and photography of ella e.mcbride. S.l.: UNIV OF WASHINGTON PRESS. ISBN 978-0924335440. OCLC 1031455437.
- Martin, David F (2009). An enduring legacy: women painters of Washington, 1930-2005. Seattle, Wash.; Chesham: University of Washington Press; Combined Academic [distributor. ISBN 9780938506119. OCLC 390937134.
- Martin, David F; Bennett, Richard; Museum of History and Industry (Seattle, Wash.) (2010). The art of Richard Bennett. Seattle, WA: Museum of History & Industry : University of Washington Press [distributor. ISBN 9780939806072. OCLC 617592008.
- Martin, David F (2015). A fluid tradition: Northwest Watercolor Society--the first 75 Years. ISBN 9780692269954. OCLC 895730753.
- MARTIN, DAVID F (2018). INVOCATION OF BEAUTY: the life and photography of soichi sunami. S.l.: CASCADIA ART MUSEUM. ISBN 978-0998911212. OCLC 1031918225.
