= Catherine Willis =

Catherine Willis may refer to:

- Catherine Willis, founder of Urban Strings Columbus Youth Orchestra
- Katherine Willis, American actress
- Catherine Willis Gray, born Catherine Grey, princess of Naples
- Katherine J. Willis, biologist

== See also ==
- Willis (surname)
