= Shizue Iwatsuki =

Japanese American poet

- Born: October 15, 1897; Okayama, Japan
- Died: July 7, 1984 (aged 86)
- Occupation: Poet

Shizue Iwatsuki (October 15, 1897 – July 7, 1984) was a Japanese American poet who immigrated to the US with her husband and children. She founded the Japanese Women's Society in Hood River, Oregon, and was the first Issei woman in Hood River to receive a driver's license. After being released from Minidoka War Relocation Center following World War II, she returned to Hood River and organized the Japanese Christian Women's Society in 1948 and also served as the president of the Northwest Women's Society. She was named Hood River County's Woman of the Year in 1974 and the Japanese government honored her with the Sixth Class Order of the Precious Crown for her cultural achievements and community service. One of Iwatsuki's tanka poems was selected by Emperor Hirohito of Japan as one of ten award winners from 32,000 worldwide submissions. She was the only award winner that did not live in Japan. Some of Shizue's poetry is displayed in the Japanese-American Historical Plaza in Portland, Oregon and is a topic at the Hood River History Museum. Her poetry also appears on boulders along the Vera Katz Eastbank Esplanade. Not unlike most Japanese women of her generation, Shizue rarely complained and showed little emotion. However, her poetry and the memoir she wrote while incarcerated in a concentration camp, shared the emotional pain and disappointment she felt as an immigrant Japanese woman.

== Biography ==
Iwatsuki was born Shizue Imai in Okayama, Japan, on October 15, 1897. At an early age, her mother enrolled her in cultural art lessons. Shizue graduated from Ashimori Entei Girls' High School where she learned 'practical skills' for homemaking, such as sewing, doll making, and flower arranging.

She married Kamegoro "Charles" Iwatsuki and moved to Hood River, Oregon in 1916. The couple had three children. Oregon's anti-alien law prohibited Issei from owning and leasing land, causing the family to struggle to make a living growing apples and strawberries. In 1923 she developed the Japanese Women's Society and focused her efforts on helping people learn English and integrate with the customs in the US, as she was one of the only Issei who could speak, write and read English. In 1926, her and her husband founded Hood River's Japanese Methodist Church. Since she was one of the only local Issei women with a driver's license, she helped many neighbors get around and run errands.

After Executive Order 9066, when her family was forced from their home to the Pinedale Assembly Center, Tule Lake, and then Minidoka concentration camps, she volunteered as a nurse and taught needlework. The Iwatsuki family was able to return to Hood River in 1945 where she continued volunteering and running the family orchard after her husband was paralyzed from a fall. Iwatsuki earned her Master's Certificate in flower arrangement in 1965 from Kyoto's Saga School and founded the Hood River Saga School, teaching classes that demonstrated the arts. In 1974, she was recognized by Emperor Hirohito who honored her with the Sixth Class Order of the Precious Crown for her cultural achievements and public service and named Hood River County's Woman of the Year.

== Poetry ==
Iwatsuki began writing in a traditional genre of Japanese poetry called tanka. She learned to read and write in English and then changed to a shorter form of poetry, but was still able to convey meaningful messages in her work. Some of her poetry now stands, engraved on granite boulders in the Japanese American Historical Plaza in Portland, Oregon. The poetry exhibited in the plaza, along the path come from other immigrant poets such as Lawson Fusao Inada, Masaki Kinoshita, and Hisako Saito. All the poems on display illustrate the struggles these Japanese Americans experienced throughout their lives, as well as important moments in Japanese American History. Shizue Iwatsuki's poems in the plaza discuss the part of her life she spent in concentration camps. Her emotional works are also on display at the Hood River history museum for people to see, as well as information about her life and contribution to the community.
