= Shiro Kashino =

American soldier (1922–1997)

Shiro Kashino (Japanese: 樫野 四郎, c. 1922 – June 11, 1997) was a soldier in the United States Army during World War II. Over the course of his career, he received six Purple Hearts, two Bronze Star Medals and a Silver Star Medal.

== Early life and education ==
Kashino was born in Seattle, Washington c. 1922. He attended Garfield High School, where he played for the football team. After the outbreak of World War II, he was placed in an internment camp for persons with Japanese ancestry by the United States federal government. He was transported to the Minidoka Relocation Center, where he volunteered to join the 442nd Infantry Regiment, a United States Army regiment consisting almost entirely of second-generation Japanese Americans. Kashino, whose parents had both died prior to the start of the War, felt no connection to Japan and claimed that he volunteered in order to "get back to a normal life again".

== Career ==
=== Military service ===
Kashino joined the United States Army in 1943, joining a large number of Japanese Americans in the 442nd Infantry Regiment. He was deployed to France, where he participated in the liberation of Bruyères from the Nazi regime. He later aided in the attempted rescue of the Lost Battalion. During the attempted rescue, Kashino put himself in the line of fire multiple times to aid other platoons, with Robert Asahina describing him as being "characteristically, the last to leave, making sure everyone else was safe ahead of him" in his 2006 book Just Americans. Barney Hajiro, who was awarded the Medal of Honor for his heroism during the attempted rescue, described Kashino as "the greatest soldier I ever saw."

During this campaign, Kashino was seriously wounded multiple times and was eventually evacuated to the United Kingdom. In January of 1945, Kashino rejoined the 442nd Regiment in the French Riviera. While stationed there, Kashino was arrested after attempting to break up a fight between a member of his regiment and the local military police. He and several other members of the 442nd were imprisoned for over a month until receiving an assignment to breach the Gothic Line.

While participating in that mission, Kashino was wounded multiple times but continued to fight at the front lines. On April 14, 1945, Kashino helped capture an enemy observation post while under heavy fire. After capturing the post, Kashino aided injured members of his platoon and single-handedly eliminated an advancing force, actions which earned him the Silver Star. Despite his heroism, when the battle was over Kashino was placed back in jail and demoted to the rank of private.

By the end of World War II, Kashino had received six Purple Hearts, a Silver Star, and a Bronze Star.

=== Post-military career ===
After returning to the United States, Kashino had trouble finding a home and employment due to racial discrimination, with real estate agents and union leaders refusing to believe that he was an American veteran. He trained as an HVAC technician but was refused admittance to the union, eventually becoming a car salesman in Lake City. Kashino attempted to have his court-martial record expunged multiple times, claiming that the military police officer involved in the incident had requested all charges be dropped. Appeals in 1985 and 1994 failed when the Army claimed to have no record of his court-martial. In 1995, after receiving assistance from U.S. Representative Patsy Mink, the records were recovered. After a final appeal in 1996 and after making contact with the military police officer involved in the initial incident, Kashino's rank of Staff Sergeant was posthumously restored on December 15, 1997.

== Personal life ==
Kashino met his wife, Louise, while in an internment camp in Puyallup, Washington. The two married in 1945 and had two daughters. Kashino died of cancer on June 11, 1997.
