= Urban Strings Columbus Youth Orchestra =

- Youth String Orchestra
- Short name: Urban Strings
- Founded: 2007
- Location: Columbus, Ohio
- Principal conductor: Chelsea Eades
- Website: https://www.urbanstringscolumbus.org/

Urban Strings Columbus Youth Orchestra is a string orchestra based in Columbus, Ohio. Its mission is to support urban and minority youth who play classical string instruments. Since 2007, over a hundred mostly African-American youth have participated either in the professional-level "Premier" orchestra, or in the intermediate and beginner feeder programs, "Half Notes" and "Quarter Notes." The orchestra tours yearly in the summers across the Southern United States, playing church auditoriums and staging tours of HBCUs (Historically Black Colleges and Universities).

== History ==
Urban Strings was founded in 2007 by community activist and educator Catherine Willis. The program was initially started with two students from Champion Middle School (an urban public school located next to a governmental housing project) but soon expanded to a full youth orchestra. For her work with Urban Strings, Ms. Willis received awards from the Columbus Symphony and the Columbus Foundation.

== Collaborations ==
Urban Strings has collaborated with international acts including hip-hop violin duo Black Violin and Ukrainian violinist Assia Ahhatt. Locally, they have an ongoing partnership with the Columbus Symphony Orchestra, and have performed at the Columbus Museum of Art and Capital University. They have recorded a Christmas album with Grammy-nominated jazz artist Bobby Floyd, and performed the works of local Black composers including Dr. Mark Lomax II and Christopher Sunami. They were featured twice at the Columbus Invitational Arts Competition, in 2013 and again in 2018, when they partnered with Fresh AIR Gallery as part of the Columbus Invitational All Stars Competition.

Their major funding partners include the national Black sororal community service organization Links, Inc, and the Columbus Foundation.

== In the Media ==
In 2013, documentary footage of Urban Strings' performance at the Columbus Invitational was released on YouTube, which led to the creation of a full length documentary URBANstrings by the Kirwan Institute for the Study of Race and Ethnicity at Ohio State University.
