= Minidoka National Historic Site =

Historic site in Idaho, USA

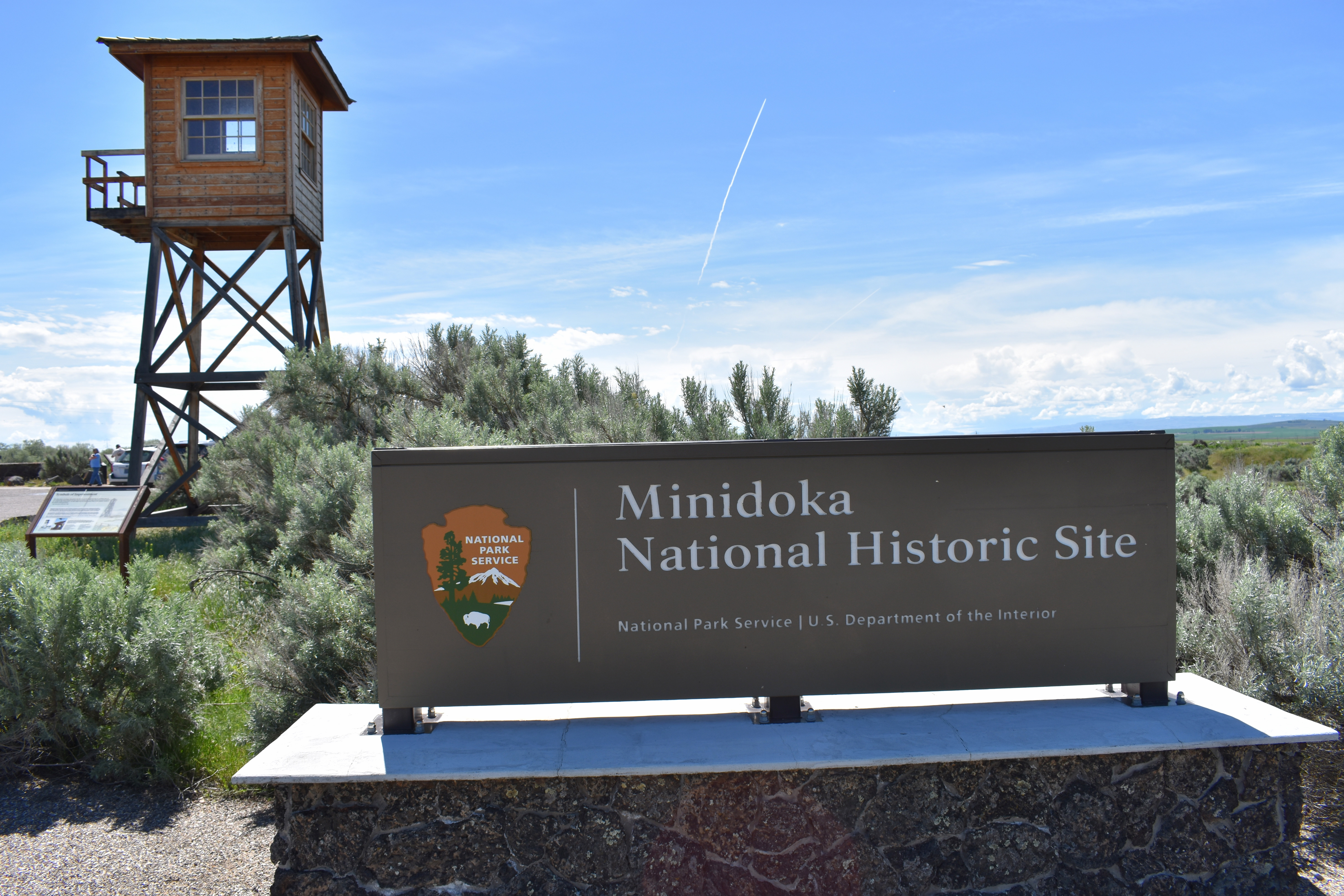
- Entrance and guard tower in 2019

- Location within Idaho Location within the United States
- Location: Hunt, Idaho, U.S.
- Nearest city: Eden
- Coordinates: 42°40′43″N 114°14′39″W
- Area: 210 acres (85 ha)
- Authorized: January 17, 2001
- Visitors: 43,539 (in 2025)
- Governing body: National Park Service
- Website: Minidoka National Historic Site

- Minidoka National Historic Site
- U.S. National Historic Site

Minidoka National Historic Site is a National Historic Site in the western United States. It commemorates the more than 13,000 Japanese Americans who were imprisoned at the Minidoka War Relocation Center during the Second World War. Among the inmates, the notation 峰土香 or 峯土香 (Minedoka) was sometimes applied.

Located in the Magic Valley of south central Idaho in Hunt, of Jerome County the site is in the Snake River Plain, a remote high desert area north east of the Snake River. It is 20 miles (32 km) northeast of Twin Falls and just north west of Eden. The site is administered by the National Park Service of the U.S. Department of the Interior, and was originally established as the Minidoka Internment National Monument in 2001. Its elevation is just under 4,000 feet (1,220 m) above sea level.

== Minidoka War Relocation Center ==
Plan of the Minidoka War Relocation Center

The Minidoka War Relocation Center operated from 1942 to 1945 as one of ten camps at which Japanese Americans, both citizens and resident "aliens", were interned during World War II. Under provisions of President Franklin D. Roosevelt's Executive Order 9066, all persons of Japanese ancestry were excluded from the West Coast of the United States. At its peak, Minidoka housed 9,397 Japanese Americans, predominantly from Oregon, Washington, and Alaska.

The Minidoka irrigation project shares its name with Minidoka County. The Minidoka name was applied to the Idaho relocation center in Hunt of Jerome County, probably to avoid confusion with the Jerome War Relocation Center in Jerome, Arkansas. Construction by the Morrison-Knudsen Company began in 1942 on the camp, which received 10,000 internees by years' end. Many of the internees worked as farm labor, and later on the irrigation project and the construction of Anderson Ranch Dam, northeast of Mountain Home. The Reclamation Act of 1902 had racial exclusions on labor which were strictly adhered to until Congress changed the law in 1943. Population at the Minidoka camp declined to 8,500 at the end of 1943, and to 6,950 by the end of 1944. The camp formally closed on October 28, 1945. On February 10, 1946, the vacated camp was turned over to the U.S. Bureau of Reclamation, which used the facilities to house returning war veterans.

The Minidoka War Relocation Center consisted of 44 blocks of housing. Each block contained 12 barracks (which themselves were divided into 6 separate living areas), laundry facilities, bathrooms, and a mess hall. Recreation Halls in each block were multi-use facilities that served as both worship and education centers. Minidoka had a high school, a junior high school and two elementary schools - Huntsville and Stafford. The Minidoka War Relocation Center also included two dry cleaners, four general stores, a beauty shop, two barber shops, radio and watch repair stores as well as two fire stations.

In June 1942, the War Department authorized the formation of the 100th Infantry Battalion consisting of 1,432 men of Japanese descent in the Hawaii National Guard and sent them to Camps McCoy and Shelby for advanced training. Because of its superior training record, FDR authorized the formation of the 442nd Regimental Combat Team (RCT) in January 1943 when 10,000 men from Hawaii signed up with eventually 2,686 being chosen along with 1,500 from the mainland. The Minidoka Internees created an Honor Roll display to acknowledge the service of their fellow Japanese-Americans. According to Echoes of Silence, 844 men from this camp volunteered or were drafted for military service. Although the original was lost after the war, the Honor Roll was recreated by the Friends of Minidoka group in 2011 following a grant from the National Park Service.

=== Terminology ===
Since the end of World War II, there has been debate over the terminology used to refer to Minidoka, and the other camps in which Americans of Japanese ancestry and their immigrant parents, were incarcerated by the United States Government during the war. Minidoka has been referred to as a "War Relocation Center", "relocation camp", "relocation center", "internment camp", and "concentration camp", and the controversy over which term is the most accurate and appropriate continues to the present day.

== National Historic Site ==
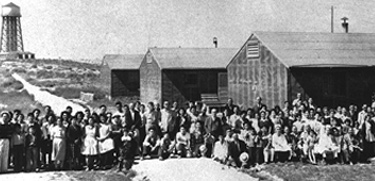
Japanese-American internees in Idaho at the Minidoka War Relocation Center

The internment camp site was listed on the National Register of Historic Places on July 10, 1979. A national monument was established in 2001 at the site by President Bill Clinton on January 17, as he invoked his authority under the Antiquities Act. Currently, visitors see the remains of the entry guard station, waiting room, and rock garden and can visit the Relocation Center display at the Jerome County Museum in nearby Jerome and the restored barracks building at the Idaho Farm and Ranch Museum southeast of town. There is a small marker adjacent to the remains of the guard station, and a larger sign at the intersection of Highway 25 and Hunt Road, which gives some of the history of the camp.

The National Park Service began a three-year public planning process in the fall of 2002 to develop a General Management Plan (GMP) and Environmental Impact Statement (EIS). The General Management Plan sets forth the basic management philosophy for the Monument and provides the strategies for addressing issues and achieving identified management objectives that will guide management of the site for the next 15–20 years.

In 2006, President George W. Bush signed H.R. 1492 into law on December 21, guaranteeing $38 million in federal money to restore the Minidoka relocation center along with nine other former Japanese internment camps.

Less than two years later on May 8, 2008, President Bush signed the Wild Sky Wilderness Act into law, which changed the status of the former U.S. National Monument to National Historic Site and added the Bainbridge Island Japanese American Exclusion Memorial on Bainbridge Island, Washington to the monument.

The Lava Ridge Wind Project has been proposed to be in the vicinity of the Minidoka site; the Bureau of Land Management's preferred siting alternative reduced the project area by 50% to ensure all wind turbines would be at least 9 miles from Minidoka National Historic Site.

== Notable Minidoka incarcerees ==
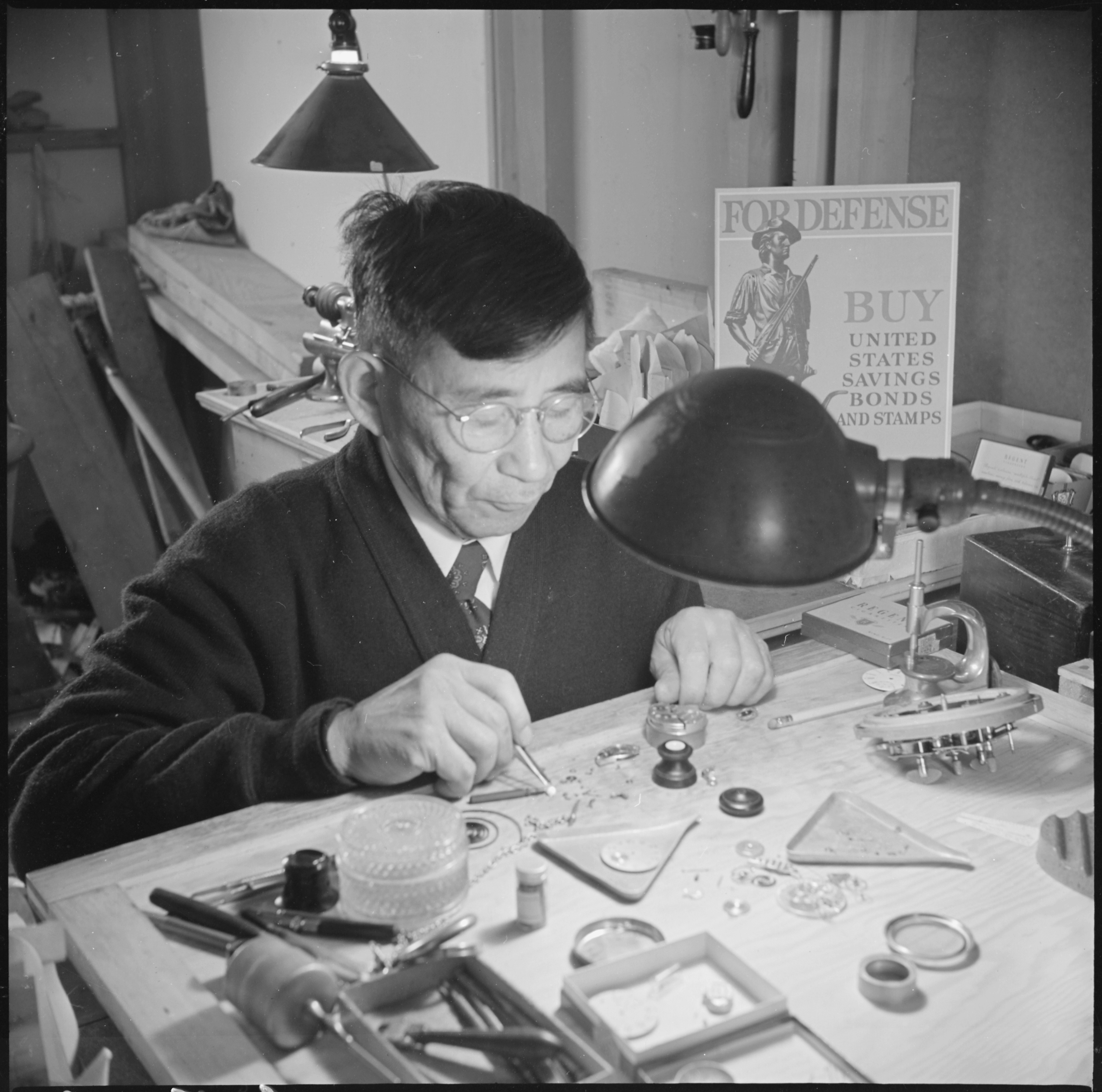
Minidoka Relocation Center, watch repair shop. Sokichi Hoshide, head watch-maker

- Kichio Allen Arai (c. 1901 – 1966), an architect.
- Paul Chihara (born 1938), an American composer.
- May Mayko Ebihara (1934–2005), an anthropologist.
- Ken Eto (1919–2004), a Japanese American mobster with the Chicago Outfit and eventually an FBI informant.
- Fumiko Hayashida (1911–2014), an American activist. Also interned at Manzanar.
- Shizue Iwatsuki (1897–1984), a Japanese American poet. Also interned at Tule Lake.
- Shiro Kashino (1922–1997), a decorated soldier in the United States Army during World War II.
- Taky Kimura (1924–2021), a martial arts practitioner and instructor. Also interned at Tule Lake.
- Joseph Kitagawa (1915–1992), professor at the University of Chicago, known for his work in the history of religions
- Fujitaro Kubota (1879–1973), an American gardener and philanthropist.
- Frank Kunishige (1878–1960), a well-known pictorialist photographer, and a founder of the Seattle Camera Club. Also detained at Camp Harmony.
- Aki Kurose (1925–1998), a Seattle teacher and civil rights activist.
- Dr Kyo Koike (1878–1947), a respected surgeon and poet, who also was a noted photographer and a founder of the Seattle Camera Club.
- John Matsudaira (1922–2007), an American painter.
- Mich Matsudaira (1937–2019), an American businessman and civil rights activist.
- Shig Murao (1926–1999), a San Francisco clerk who played a prominent role in the San Francisco Beat scene.
- Mako Nakagawa (1937–2021), a Japanese American educator and former director of the Japanese American Cultural Heritage Program and the Rainbow Program
- William K. Nakamura (1922–1944), a United States Army soldier and a recipient of the Medal of Honor.
- George Nakashima (1905–1990), a Japanese American woodworker, architect, and furniture maker.
- Mira Nakashima (born 1942), an architect and furniture maker.
- Kenjiro Nomura (1896–1956), a Japanese-American painter.
- Frank Okada (1931–2000), an American Abstract Expressionist painter.
- John Okada (1923–1971), a Japanese American writer.
- James Sakamoto (1903–1955), a journalist, boxer and community organizer.
- James Sakoda (1916–2005), a psychologist and pioneer in computational modeling. Also interned at Tule Lake.
- Bell M. Shimada (1922–1958), an American fisheries scientist.
- Roger Shimomura (born 1939), an American artist and Professor of Art (ret).
- Monica Sone (1919–2011), a Japanese American novelist.
- Bob H. Suzuki (1936–2024), an educator and university administrator.
- Gary A. Tanaka (born 1943), a Japanese American businessman.
- Kamekichi Tokita (1897–1948), a Japanese American painter and diarist.
- Tama Tokuda (1920–2013), a performer and writer.
- Chiye Tomihiro (1924–2012), an activist.
- Mary Mon Toy (1916–2009), a Japanese-American actress, showgirl, and secretary.
- Herbert T. Ueda (1929–2020), an American ice drilling engineer.
- Newton K. Wesley (1917–2011), an optometrist and an early pioneer of the contact lens
- Kenji Yamada (1924–2014), a two-time U.S. National Judo champion
- Mitsuye Yamada (born 1923), a Japanese American writer.
- Takuji Yamashita (1874–1959), an early 20th-century civil rights pioneer. Also interned at Tule Lake and Manzanar.
- Minoru Yasui (1916–1986), a Japanese American lawyer who challenged the constitutionality of curfews used during World War II in Yasui v. United States.

== See also ==
- Bibliography of the Japanese American Internment during World War II
- Outline of Japanese American Internment during World War II
- National Parks in Idaho
- Amache National Historic Site
- Kooskia Internment Camp
- Manzanar
- Tule Lake National Monument
- Camp Rupert, a nearby facility for Italian and German prisoners of war
- Minidoka Irrigator (Minidoka internment camp newspaper)
- War Relocation Authority
- Other camps:
  - Gila River War Relocation Center
  - Heart Mountain Relocation Center
  - Jerome War Relocation Center
  - Poston War Relocation Center
  - Rohwer War Relocation Center
  - Topaz War Relocation Center
