= Minidoka Irrigator =

Weekly newspaper at the Minidoka Relocation Center

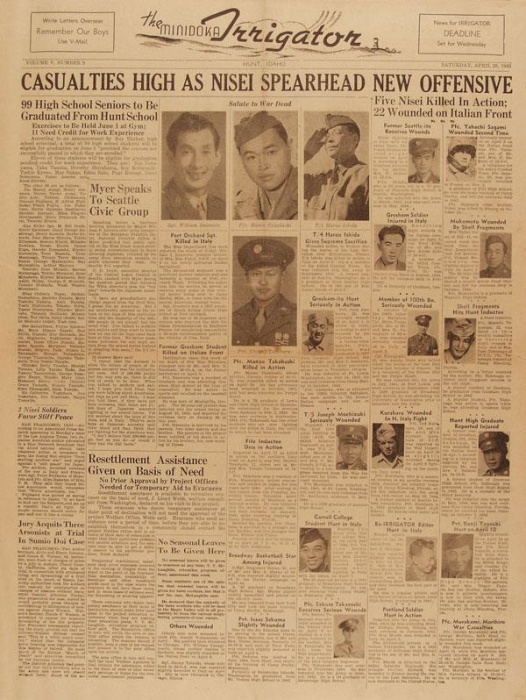
- Minidoka Irrigator, Vol. V, No. 4, April 28, 1945
- Type: Weekly newspaper
- Founded: 1942
- Ceased publication: 1945
- City: Hunt, Jerome County, Idaho
- Country: United States

The Minidoka Irrigator was a weekly newspaper published at the Minidoka Relocation Center located in Hunt, Jerome County, Idaho.

Publication began on September 10, 1942, and ended on July 28, 1945. It was one of many newspapers published in 10 War Relocation Authority (WRA) relocation centers.

The newspapers served as a means for disseminating WRA rules, regulations and surveys. The WRA initially banned the use of Japanese in the newspapers but later issues sometimes included Japanese-language inserts. Newspaper articles cover a wide range of topics including daily activities, beauty tips, diet and nutrition, crime and law enforcement, education, hobbies, social activities and sports.

== See also ==
- Manzanar Free Press
