= Wayne Albee =

American photographer (1882-1937)

Wayne Clinton Albee
- Born: 1882; St. Paul, Minnesota, U.S.
- Died: 1937 (aged 54–55); San Diego, California

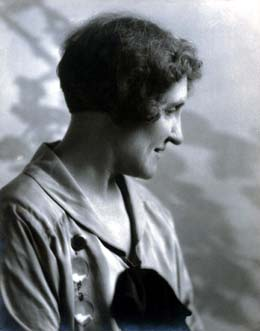
Ella McBride by Albee ca 1921

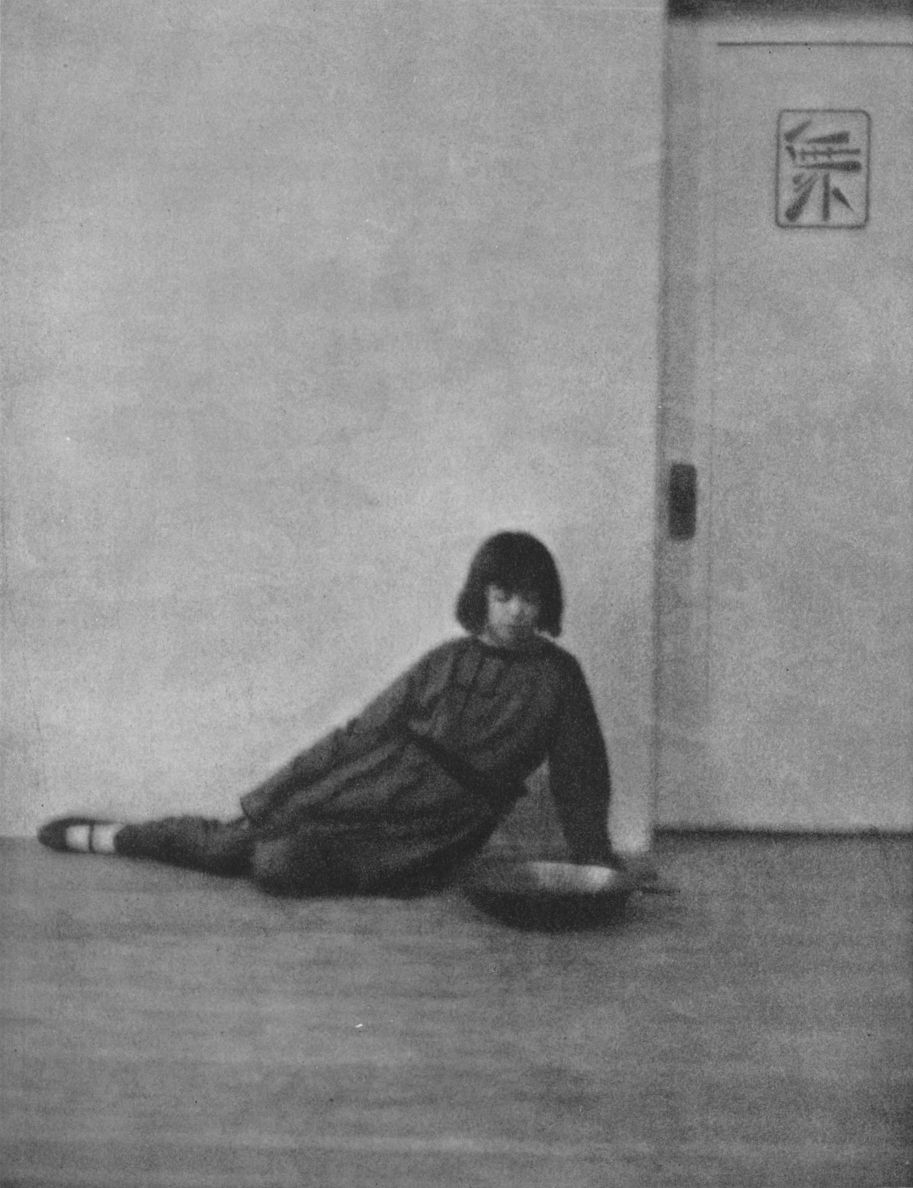
In a dancer's studio (1922)

Wayne Clinton Albee (1882–1937) was an American pictorialist photographer, best known for his portraits of dancers such as ballerina Anna Pavlova, Adoplh Bolm of the Ballets Russes, and early modern dance pioneers Doris Humphrey, Ted Shawn, and Ruth St. Denis.

Albee got his start at age sixteen, working in a photographic supply shop owned by Byron Harmon. He went on to work for McBride Studios with business partner Ella E. McBride. She soon become a well-known photographer in her own right, and credited Albee's influence with inspiring her to learn to take her own photographs. He also was an early mentor to the Japanese American photographers Frank Kunishige and Soichi Sunami, who assisted him at McBride Studios.

He was an informal advisor to the Seattle Camera Club, and he also served for many years as the chief judge at the Frederick & Nelson art salons.
