= Byron Harmon =

Canadian photographer (1876–1942)

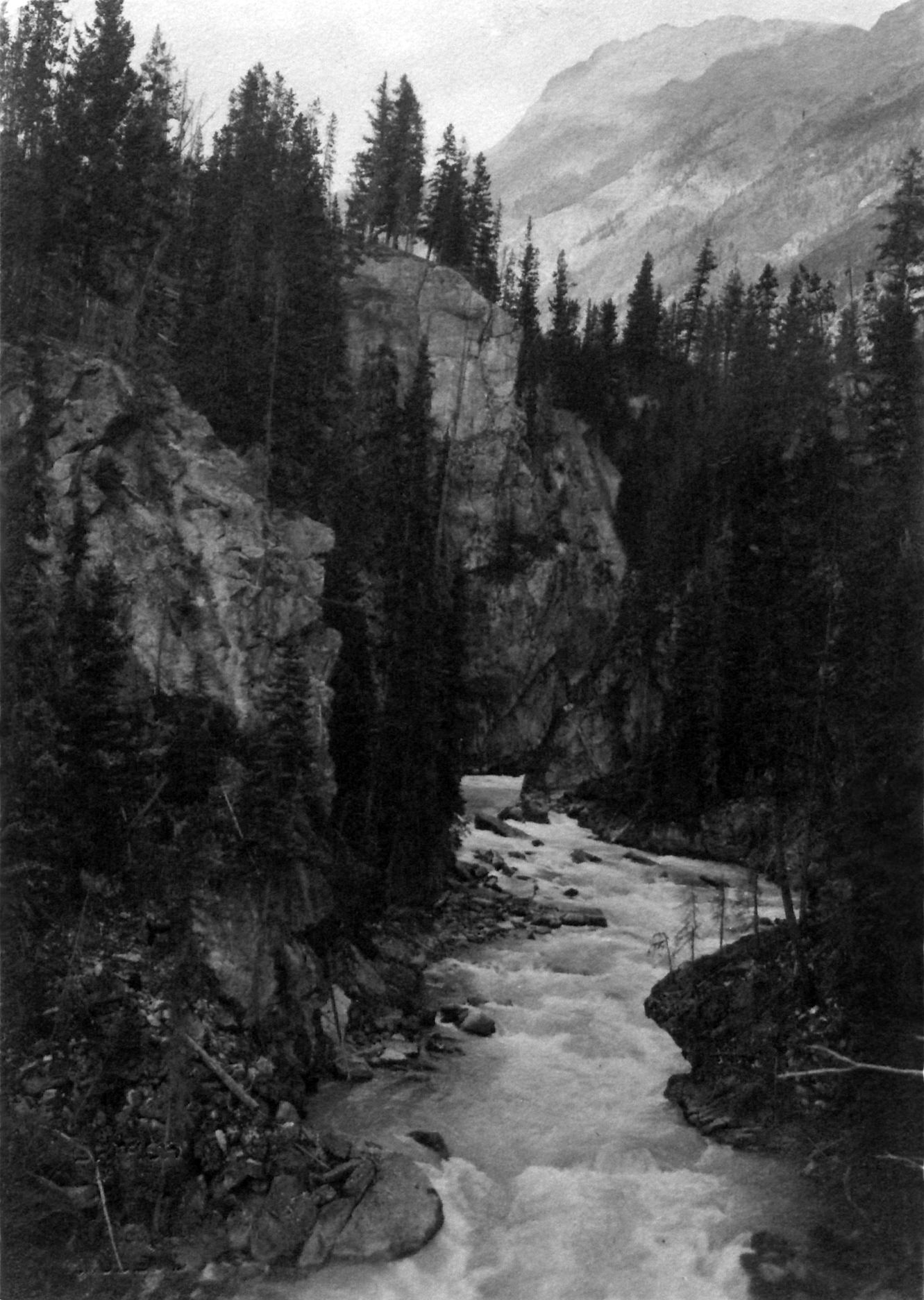
Moose Canyon, British Columbia (1911)

Byron Hill Harmon (1876–1942) was a pioneering photographer of the Canadian Rockies. Harmon was born in Tacoma, Washington. Prior to his move to Canada, Harmon got his start in photography as the proprietor of a photographic supply store in Washington State, where his employees included future dance photographer Wayne Albee.

In 1903 Harmon took up residence in Banff, Alberta and started a photography business there. He was a charter member of and the official photographer to the Alpine Club of Canada from its outset in 1906. Over the next 30 years Harmon became a leading citizen of Banff, founding the local Board of Trade, the Rotary Club, and serving in municipal government.

His collection of more than 6500 photographs provides an outstanding, thorough, and vivid representation of the Canadian Rockies in the early 20th century. The collection is now housed at the Whyte Museum in Banff.

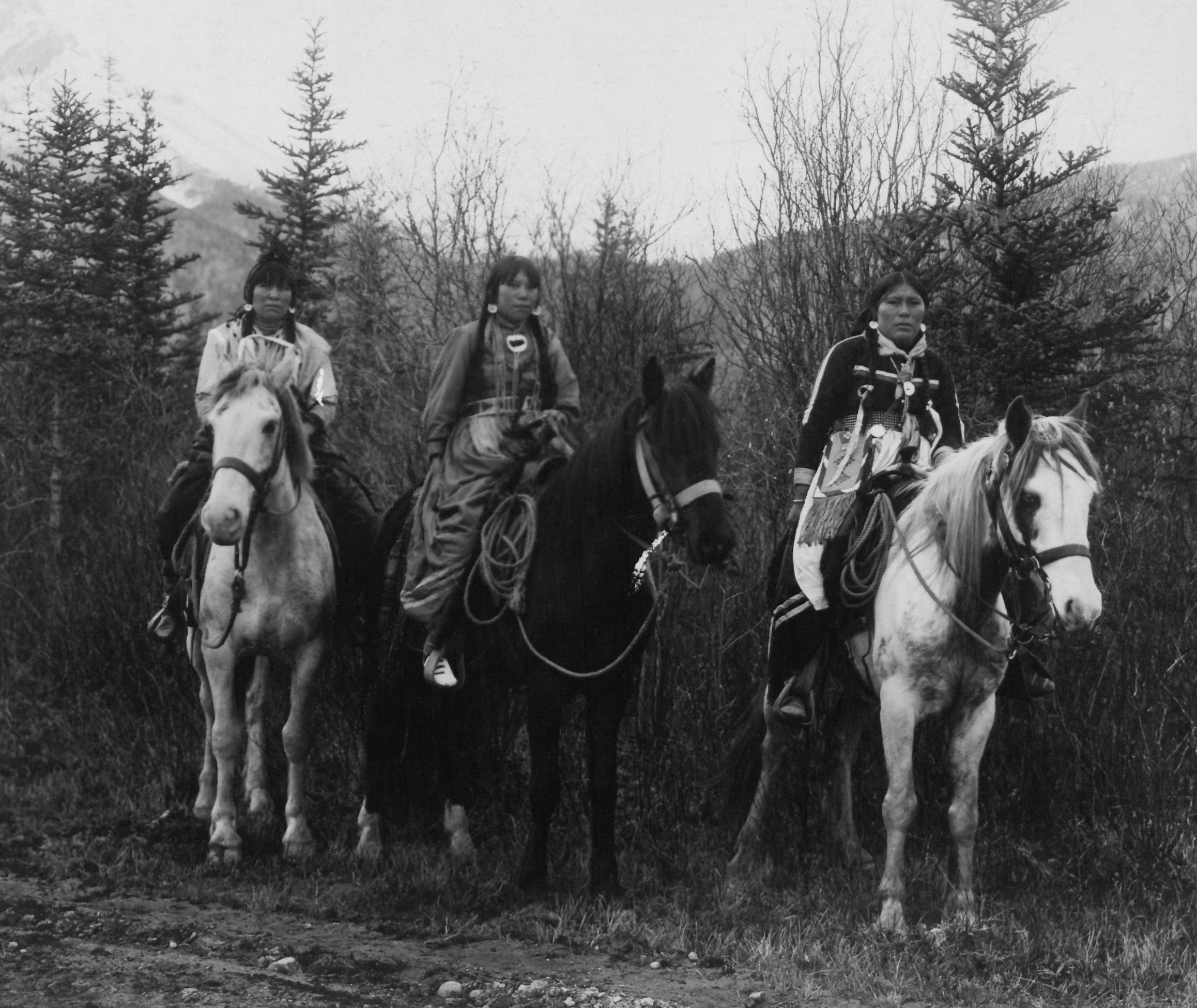
Gussie Good Stonie and friends (1907)

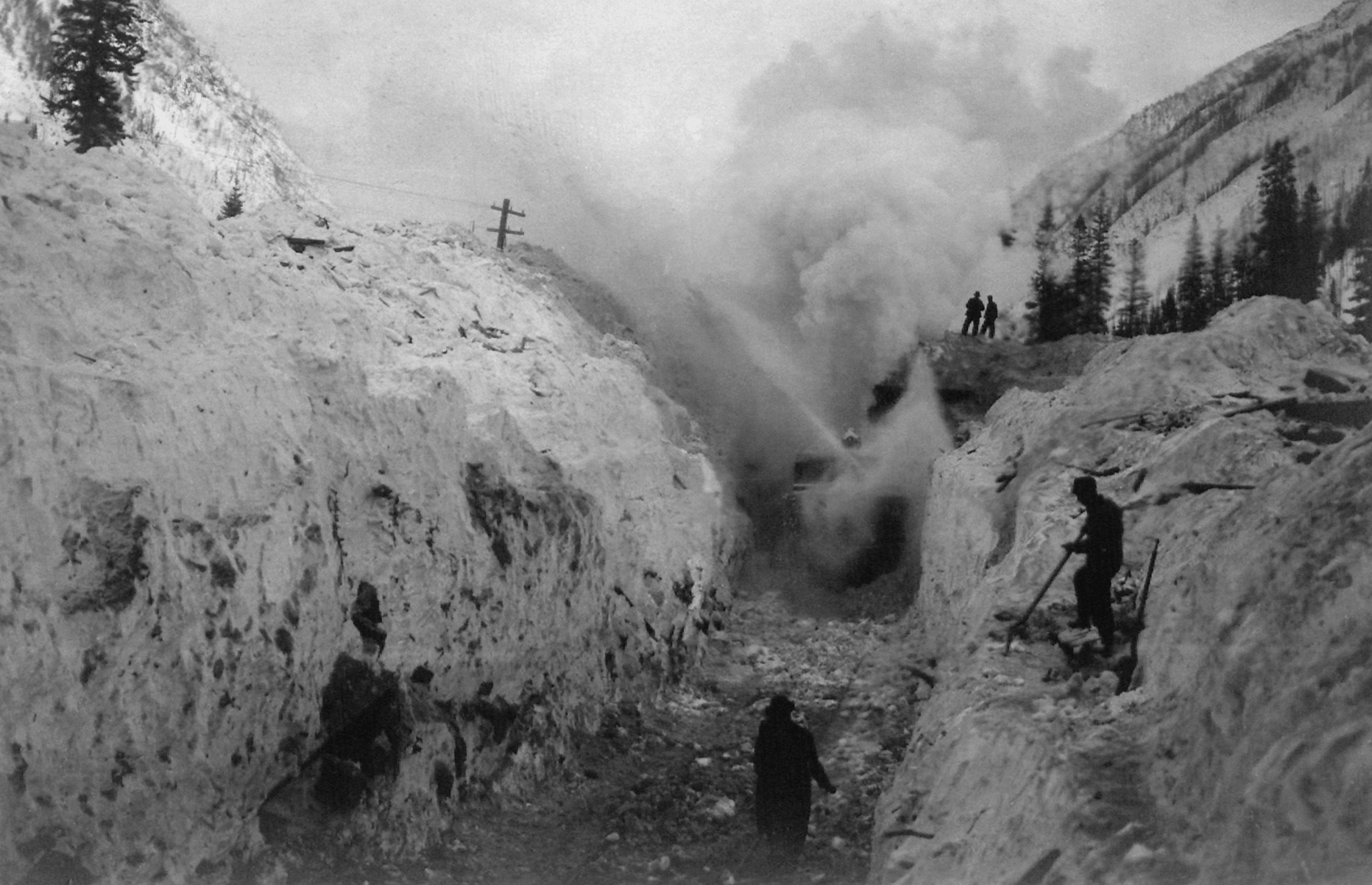
Rotary snow plow (1910)
