= Annie Wright Schools =

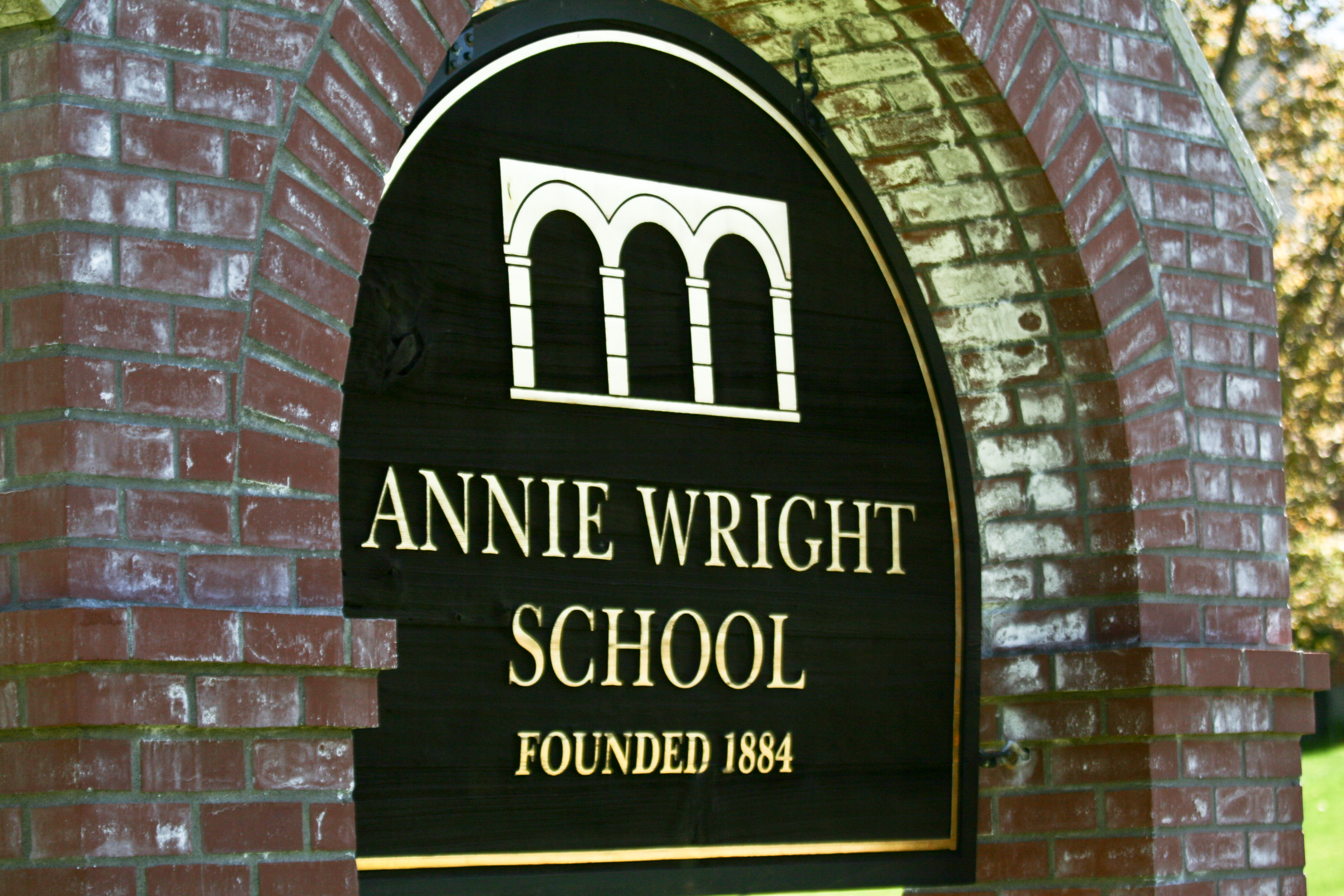

Location
- 827 North Tacoma Avenue; Tacoma, Pierce County, Washington 98403; United States; 47°16′06″N 122°27′35″W

Information
- Former name: Annie Wright Seminary
- Type: Independent college-preparatory boarding & day school
- Motto: From strength to strength
- Religious affiliation: Christianity
- Denomination: Episcopal
- Established: 1884; 142 years ago
- Founders: John A. Paddock; Charles Barstow Wright
- Status: Currently operational
- NCES School ID: 01462009
- Head of school: Jake Guadnola
- Faculty: 76.6 (on an FTE basis)
- Gender: Mixed-sex (PS to grade 8); Single-sex (grades 9–12)
- Enrollment: 693 (2021-2022)
  - Pre-kindergarten: 74
  - Kindergarten: 48
  - Grade 1: 48
  - Grade 2: 48
  - Grade 3: 34
  - Grade 4: 34
  - Grade 5: 34
  - Grade 6: 38
  - Grade 7: 51
  - Grade 8: 50
  - Grade 9: 85
  - Grade 10: 58
  - Grade 11: 75
  - Grade 12: 51
- Average class size: 17
- Student to teacher ratio: 8.1:1
- Hours in school day: 7.2
- Campus type: Midsize city
- Colors: Navy and gold
- Athletics conference: 1a Nisqually League
- Sports: Basketball, cross country, golf, football, swim, tennis, track and field, volleyball
- Mascot: Chomp
- Nickname: Gators
- Affiliations: NAIS, NWAIS, NCGS, IBSC, ERB
- Website: aw.org

Annie Wright Schools is a private school in Tacoma, Washington, United States. It is subdivided into Annie Wright Lower School (boys and girls in preschool through grade 5), Annie Wright Middle School (boys and girls in grades 6 to 8), Annie Wright Upper School for Girls (all-girls day and boarding programs for grades 9 to 12), and Annie Wright Upper School for Boys (all-boys day and boarding programs for grades 9 to 12). It was founded in 1884 by Charles Barstow Wright and Bishop John A. Paddock. It has an indoor pool; two gyms; science, design, and technology labs; art and music studios; theatre; outdoor gardens; play areas; athletic fields; and open spaces. The school is an accredited member of National Association of Independent Schools (NAIS), and a member of Northwest Association of Independent Schools (NWAIS), National Coalition of Girls' Schools (NCGS), the International Boys' Schools Coalition (IBSC), and the Educational Records Bureau (ERB). Annie Wright is also a certified International Baccalaureate (IB) World School, offering IB curricula throughout the schools.

== History ==
Annie Wright Schools were founded as Annie Wright Seminary by the Right Reverend John A. Paddock and Charles Barstow Wright, who named it for Charles's daughter Annie, to educate the daughters of the pioneers.

In 1884, Annie Wright Seminary opened its doors to 46 students from the Washington Territory, Oregon, British Columbia and Hawaii. At that time, there were 10 faculty members. The first school catalog outlined the offerings of Annie Wright Seminary: "For board, furnished room, tuition in English branches and Latin, and laundry service, $350 a year."

By the early 1900s, the school building had become too small to meet demand. The school sought a new location and building to provide much-needed space, purchasing property on North Tacoma Avenue, where the cornerstone of a new building was laid on June 9, 1924. Construction of the school was completed in time for the start of the 1924–25 school year, and the doors opened to students on September 18, 1924.

Mary McCarthy wrote of her time at Annie Wright Seminary in her memoirs Memories of a Catholic Girlhood and How I Grew.

In 2009, Annie Wright Schools became an International Baccalaureate World School, offering the IB Diploma Programme, with the first diploma recipients in 2011. In 2015, the school was authorized to offer the IB Primary Years Programme in Preschool through Grade 5. As of 2017, Annie Wright Schools also qualified for the Middle Years Programme.

In January 2017, Annie Wright Schools announced the decision to launch an Upper School for Boys, which opened on August 30, 2017, with 15 ninth-grade boys.

In June 2018, Annie Wright Schools broke ground on two projects: a new academic building for the boys' upper school and a third gym with an underground pool. The academic building opened for the first school day on August 28, 2019. Tacoma Mayor Victoria Woodards officially opened the building at a community ceremony on Friday, September 6. The new gym and pool opened in December 2019.

After serving as Head of Annie Wright Schools for 10 years, Christian Sullivan ended his tenure on June 30, 2020. Jake Guadnola, who had previously served as the Director for Upper School for Girls and is an Annie Wright alumnus, began his tenure as the current Head of Schools.

The first class of high school boys graduated in spring 2021. Later that fall, AWS launched its first cohort of Tacoma Scholars, a program that aims to "provide an AWS education to Tacoma students who come from historically disadvantaged communities."

== Student life ==
As a preschool-12 program, student life varies by division. The following focuses on student life in the upper schools.

(s)Electives

At the high school level, students take (s)Electives, which vary each year and are student-directed. Recent offerings include: Automotive Arts, Business, Community, Creative Writing, Fashion, Great Outdoor Adventure Team (GOAT), Mock Trial, Model UN, Inkwell student magazine, Rocketry, Sports Medicine, STEM, and Student Government.

Arts

The school emphasizes the arts heavily. There is usually an all-school play and at least one theatre performance for each division. They also have an orchestra and an artist laureate program.

Athletics

The school is part of the 1A Nisqually League and offers basketball, cross-country, golf, football, swimming, tennis, track and field, and volleyball.

State Tournament History

- 2024-2025 Boys Basketball 1st Place
- 2024-2025 Girls Basketball 5th Place
- 2023-2024 Boys Basketball 2nd Place
- 2022-2023 Girls Volleyball 2nd Place
- 2021-2022 Girls Volleyball 4th Place
- 2019-2020 Girls Basketball 4th Place
- 2013-2014 Girls Volleyball 8th Place
- 2012-2013 Girls Volleyball 7th Place
- 2009-2010 Girls Volleyball 5th Place

State Champions History

- Tennis: Taryn Anderson '03, Singles - 2002, 2003; Sasha Carter '08, Singles - 2008; Agye Mintah '16, Singles - 2016
- Track & Field: Li Murphy '10, 400m - 2008, 2009, 2010 and 800m - 2009
- Cross Country: Will Carroll '25, 2023 & 2024
- Boys Basketball 2024–2025

== Notable alumni ==
- Betty Garrett (1919–2011) – actress
- Beulah Loomis Hyde (1886-1983) – artist
- Helen Herrick Malsed (1910-1998) - Toy inventor
- Mary McCarthy (1912–1989) – author
- Eloise Mumford – actress
- Alison Rose 1944-2025 - Model, actress, and writer
- Merrill Wagner - American visual artist

== See also ==
- Washington College (Tacoma)
