= Beulah Loomis Hyde =

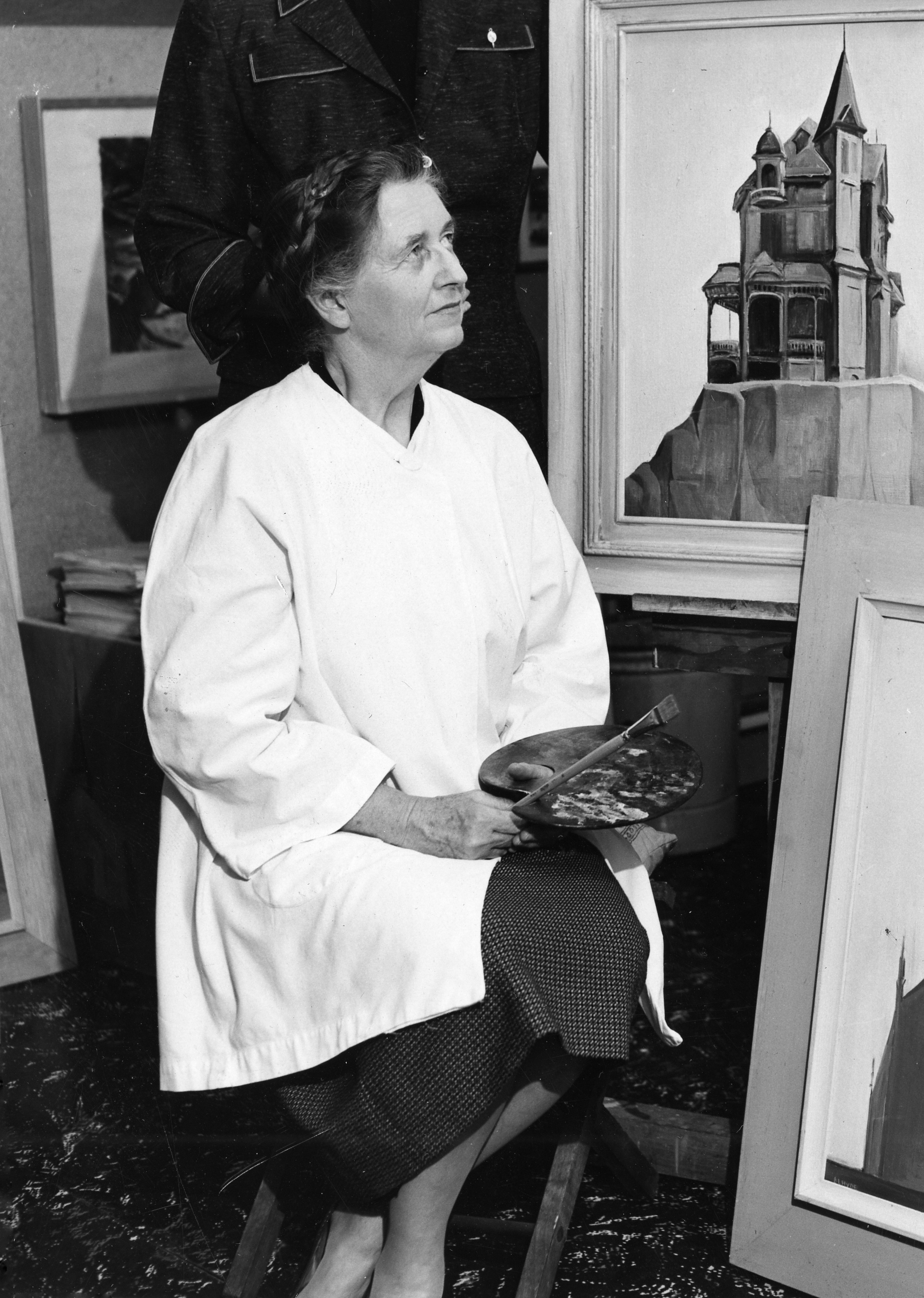
- Beulah Loomis Hyde in her studio, 1954
- Born: January 24, 1886; Kansas, United States
- Died: January 19, 1983 (aged 96); Tacoma, Washington, United States
- Education: Annie Wright Seminary
- Known for: Painting
- Movement: Precisionism, Surrealism, and geometric abstraction

Beulah Loomis Hyde (January 24, 1886 – January 19, 1983) was an American painter and arts patron based in Tacoma, Washington. Active particularly from the 1930s through the 1960s, she gained regional recognition for depicting industrial and architectural subjects through a personal blend of Precisionism, Surrealism, and geometric abstraction. Her work was exhibited widely in Northwest galleries during her lifetime and was featured in a major retrospective at the Cascadia Art Museum.

== Early life and education ==
Beulah Loomis was born on January 24, 1886, in Kansas. Her family moved to Tacoma, Washington, in 1888, where she spent most of her life. She studied at Abbot Academy in Andover, Massachusetts, from 1896 to 1898. After graduating from Annie Wright Seminary (Annie Wright Schools) Tacoma in 1904 and Ingleside School in New Milford, Connecticut, in 1907, Hyde began developing her artistic skills with local mentors. She initially worked in graphite and watercolor during the early 1900s before pausing her career to raise three sons.

== Career ==
Hyde resumed painting around the mid-1930s, after studying with the well-known American painter Mark Tobey and other regional artists. She developed a distinct visual style focused on industrial and urban landscapes of Tacoma and its environs, including factories, bridges, and waterfront scenes. Her mature style incorporated elements of Precisionism, Surrealism and geometric abstraction—often rendering cityscapes with sharply defined forms and structured compositions.

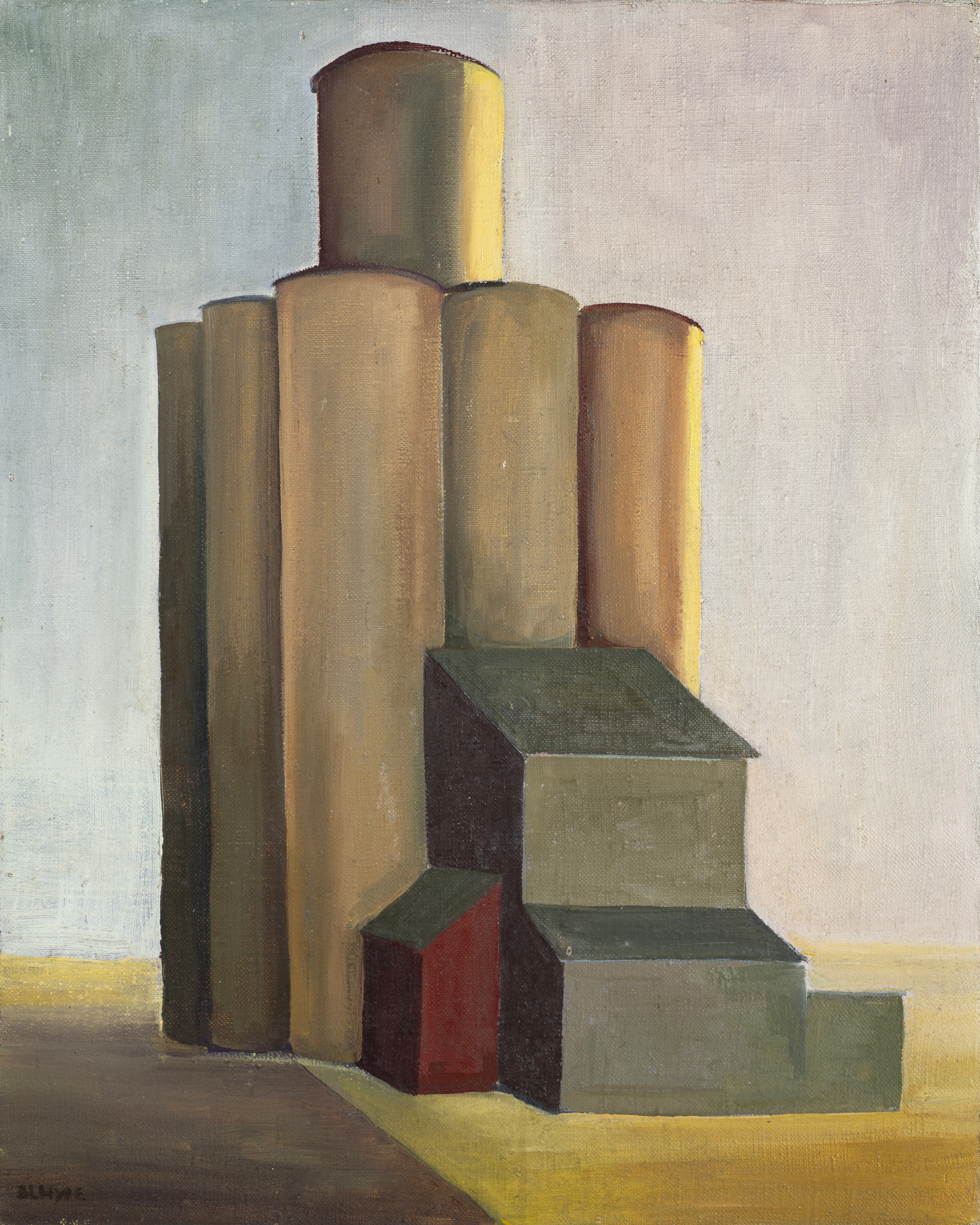
Untitled, ca. 1940–45. Collection of the Estate of B.L. Hyde, Cascadia Art Museum, Edmonds, WA

Hyde exhibited primarily in Pacific Northwest venues during her life, including representation by Seattle's Zoe Dusanne Gallery. Despite regional acclaim, her work remained largely in private hands until a posthumous retrospective at the Cascadia Art Museum from October 2024 to February 2025 (“Structure and Form: The Art of B.L. Hyde”), showcasing more than fifty works borrowed from her descendants and museum collections such as the Tacoma Art Museum and the Cascadia Art Museum. Following this retrospective, the Whitney Museum of American Art acquired three of her paintings, and works by Hyde were subsequently acquired by several other institutions, including the Addison Gallery of American Art, the Amon Carter Museum of American Art, the Denver Art Museum, the O’Brien Art Foundation, and The Wolfsonian–Florida International University.

== Legacy ==
Hyde was described as a pioneering figure in Northwest modernism, bringing attention to industrial subjects through a modern visual language during an era when women artists were rarely given prominence. The 2024 exhibition and accompanying publication by the Cascadia Art Museum and the University of Washington Press helped spark renewed scholarly and public interest in her work.

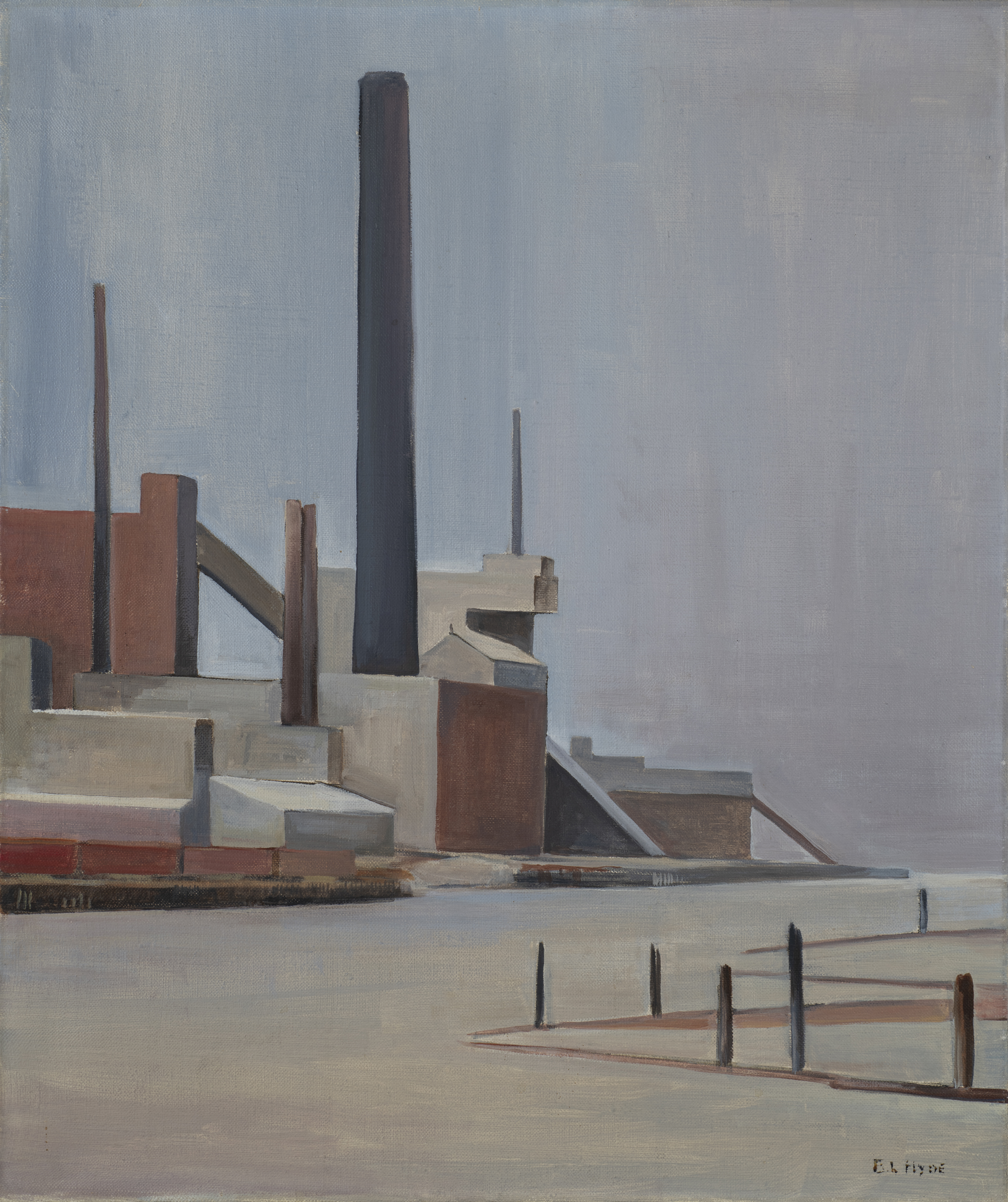
Waterfront, ca. 1945–50. Collection of the Estate of B.L. Hyde, Cascadia Art Museum, Edmonds, WA
