= May Mayko Ebihara =

American anthropologist

May Mayko Ebihara (May 12, 1934 – April 23, 2005) was the first American anthropologist to conduct ethnographic research in Cambodia. At the time of her death from a respiratory illness, she was professor emeritus of Anthropology at Lehman College, City University of New York, and the CUNY Graduate Center.

== Early life and education ==
Ebihara was born in Portland, Oregon on May 12, 1934. She and her family were sent with other Japanese Americans to the Minidoka War Relocation Center in Idaho during World War II, following the enforcement of Executive Order 9066.

She earned her bachelor's degree from Reed College in 1955 and a PhD in 1968 from Columbia University, where she studied with Conrad Arensberg, Margaret Mead, and Morton Fried. Ebihara conducted her doctoral research in Svay Village in Kandal Province from 1959 to 1960 resulting in a two volume published dissertation titled “Svay, a Khmer Village in Cambodia.” Her dissertation provided detailed information about peasant village life in Svay, with particular attention to social structure, kinship, agriculture, religion, and political organization in Cambodia before the Cambodia-Vietnamese war and the genocide by Pol Pot’s Khmer Rouge. Her research is among the only sources to document life in Cambodia before the war.

== Career ==
While studying as a doctoral student, Ebihara taught at Bard College from 1961 to 1964, briefly at Mt. Holyoke, and thereafter at Lehman College. Ebihara returned to Cambodia several times between 1989 and 1996 to continue her research and reconnect with the people of Svay, after the withdrawal of Vietnamese forces in 1989.

Her archive is held at Northern Illinois University.

== Personal life ==
When Ebihara returned to Cambodia in 1989 she found that half of the people of Svay had been killed during the war, including her adopted parents and grandparents.

Dr Ebihara was survived by her husband, Marvin Gelfand, and her sons, Adam and Jeremy.

== Published works ==
- Ebihara, May Mayko (1968). Svay, A Khmer Village In Cambodia (Thesis). OCLC 605983117. NAID 10026741083 ProQuest 302337139.
- Ebihara, May Mayko (2018). Mertha, Andrew C. (ed.). Svay: A Khmer Village in Cambodia. Cornell University Press. doi:10.7591/9781501714801. ISBN 978-1-5017-1480-1. JSTOR 10.7591/j.ctt1w0ddbg. S2CID 239261434. Project MUSE book 57366.
