= Frank Kunishige =

Japanese-American Pictorialist photographer

- Kunishige Asakichi
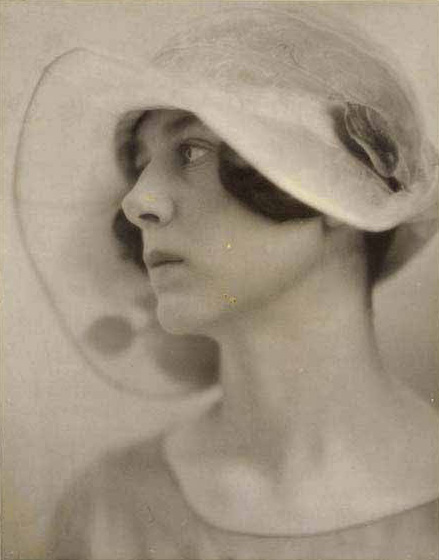
- Portrait of unidentified woman, "Betti", c. 1924
- Born: Asakichi Kunishige; June 5, 1878; Agenosho, Ōshima-gun, Yamaguchi-ken, Japan
- Died: April 9, 1960 (aged 81); Seattle, Washington

Asakichi “Frank” Kunishige (1878–1960) was a Japanese-American Pictorialist photographer. He was a founding member of the Seattle Camera Club. He created and sold his own photographic paper, Textura Tissue, which was a favorite of club members because it emphasized the soft qualities that Pictorial photographers prized. Along with Wayne Albee and Soichi Sunami, he worked for Ella E. McBride at the McBride studio. During the 1920s, Kunishige’s work was included in many prominent international exhibitions including those of the Royal Photographic Society, London; the Pittsburgh Salon; the Buffalo Salon; the Paris Salon; and numerous others. From 1925 through 1929, he was one of the most exhibited Pictorialist photographers in the world. His work was illustrated in national and international publications including Photofreund, the American Annual of Photography and Photo-Era.

During the Internment of Japanese Americans during WWII, following the signing of Executive Order 9066, Kunishige was detained at Camp Harmony before being transferred to Minidoka in Idaho.
