= Chiye Tomihiro =

Japanese-American activist

Chiye Tomihiro (December 20, 1924 – October 21, 2012) was a Japanese American activist who played a critical role in the passage of the Civil Liberties Act of 1988.

== Early life ==
Tomihiro was born on December 20, 1924, in Portland, Oregon. Her father was involved in real estate. He held a law degree from the University of Oregon Law School, but could not practice because he did not have citizenship. Despite this, he advised other people in the Japanese community about their legal problems. He was a prominent businessman and held a stake in a building in Portland.

== Incarceration and recovery ==
After the December 7, 1941 attack on Pearl Harbor, President Roosevelt issued Executive Order 9066, compelling the forced evacuation and incarceration of Japanese-Americans from the West Coast in concentration camps. The night, the US Federal Bureau of Investigation (FBI) arrested Tomihiro's father while she, her siblings, and her mother were at a church event. They came home to find their apartment ransacked and learned he was being held at Multnomah County Jail. Her father was later incarcerated in Santa Fe, New Mexico. In September 1942, Tomihiro was incarcerated at Minidoka. She recalls feeling a sense of blind trust and patriotism, which quickly shifted to feelings of betrayal upon her incarceration.

Following her incarceration, Tomihiro resettled in Denver, Colorado, before moving to Chicago, Illinois.

During their incarceration, her father's friend took care of the hotel, but eventually sold the building for "practically nothing". When her family resettled in Chicago, this left him with very few opportunities for work upon his release. He was never able to find stable employment. Her mother found work as a seamstress, but they were living in a "dank and dark and roach and rodent infested" apartment. In the ten years following her college graduation, Tomihiro gave most of her paychecks to her mother to provide some financial stability.

== Education ==
Tomihiro attended Denver University before transferring to the University of Wisconsin–Madison. She graduated with a Bachelor's degree in math with a minor in business.

== Activism ==
Tomihiro was a lifelong member of the Japanese American Citizens League (JACL) and served as the Chicago chapter president from 1977 to 1978. She was also the JACL Chicago's chairperson of the redress committee, where she played a major role in organizing their organizing efforts to get reparations. Tomihiro led volunteer recruitment to get people to testify about their experiences to the Commission on Wartime Relocation and Internment of Civilians. JACL Chicago ended up gathering around eighty people who were willing to testify. Tomihiro also testified to the commission. Her organizing efforts and testimony played a major role in the passing of the Civil Liberties Act of 1988, which granted reparations to the incarcerated Japanese Americans.

She was also a supporter of the American Friends Service Committee.

== Death ==
She died on October 21, 2012.
