= Mako Nakagawa =

Japanese educator

- Born: February 1937; Seattle
- Died: April 4, 2021 (aged 83–84)
- Alma mater: University of Washington; Seattle University
- Occupation: Teacher, head teacher
- Employer: Seattle Public Schools

Mako Nakagawa, born Masako Takahashi, (February 1, 1937 – April 24, 2021) was a Japanese American educator, director of the Japanese American Cultural Heritage Program and the Rainbow Program, and influential member of the Japanese American Citizen's League.

== Early life ==
Nakagawa was born in Seattle, Washington to Hisako and Masao Takahashi. She was the third of four daughters.

== Incarceration ==
After the December 7, 1941 attack on Pearl Harbor, President Roosevelt issued Executive Order 9066, compelling the forced evacuation and incarceration of Japanese-Americans from the West Coast in concentration camps. As part of this order, Nakagawa was incarcerated at the age of five. She was incarcerated with her mother and sisters at Puyallup Assembly Center, Washington and Minidoka Incarceration Camp, Idaho. Her father had been arrested and separated from the family at the start of their incarceration. They did not reunite until 1944, when Nakagawa and her family were sent to Crystal City Internment Camp in Texas. The family was released in late April 1946.

== Education ==
Nakagawa earned a Bachelor's degree from the University of Washington and a Master's degree from Seattle University.

== Career and Activism ==
Nakagawa worked as an educator for many years. Nakagawa co-developed and directed the Rainbow Program, a diversity training program for elementary school students in the Seattle Public School system. Nakagawa also was an elementary school principal. Later on, she worked as a multicultural specialist with the Washington State Office of Superintendent of Public Instruction, where she developed educational curriculum and developed the concept of "cooperative pluralism."

Nakagawa started her own educational consulting business, Mako & Associates, which specialized in assisting clients interested in projects related to diversity training and Japanese American experiences in World War 2.

In 1981, Nakagawa helped her father prepare his testimony for the Commission on Wartime Relocation and Internment of Civilians. She translated his testimony to English and read it aloud during the hearing, as well as served as a translator for her father.

Nakagawa was also heavily involved in many Japanese American advocacy organizations. She was an active member of the Japanese American Citizen's League, serving as Seattle chapter president in 1983 and working with the national board. Nakagawa spearheaded JACL's campaign to eliminate the euphemistic wording that is commonly used when describing Japanese American experiences during World War II. She presented this campaign at JACL conferences in 2010 and 2011. On July 7, 2012, the completed handbook of outdated terms was unanimously implemented.

In 2019, Nakagawa published Child Prisoner in American Concentration Camps, a memoir of her incarceration.

== Personal life ==
Nakagawa had three children, Daren, Bradly Kenji and DeeAn.

She was a big fan of the Seattle Seahawks.

== Death ==
She died on April 24, 2021.

== Legacy ==
Power of Words, Nakagawa's initiative to change the wording around Japanese American experiences during World War II has grown since the resolution's passing. The JACL has published multiple handbooks, implementation plans, and educational curriculum about these terminologies.
