= Seattle Camera Club =

Photographers club during 1920s

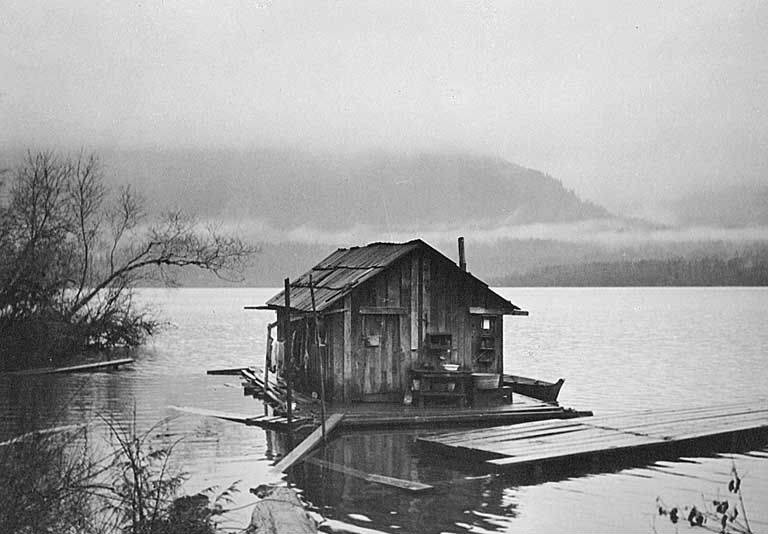
Called a Home by Kyo Koike

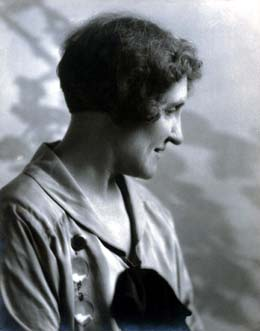
Ella McBride by Wayne Albee ca 1921

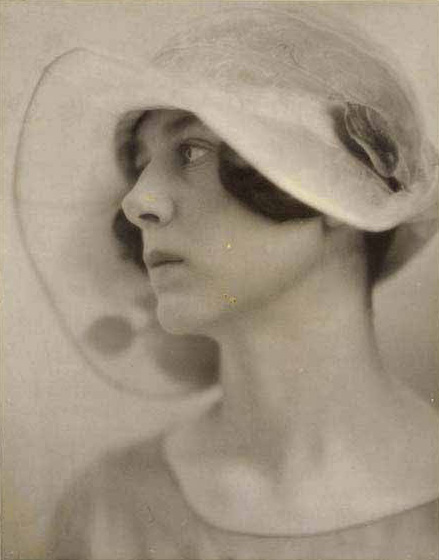
Portrait of unidentified woman, "Betti" by Frank Kunishige

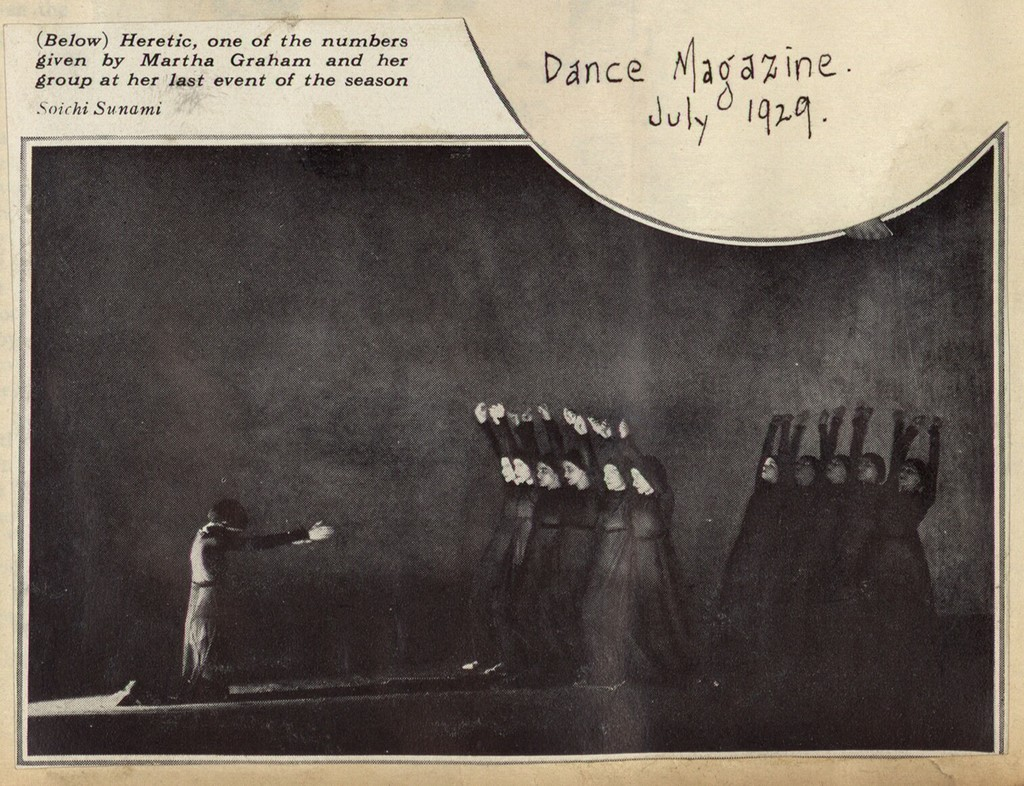
Martha Graham's "Heretic" by Soichi Sunami

The Seattle Camera Club (SCC) was an organization of photographers active in Seattle, Washington, during the 1920s. It was founded in 1924 by Japanese immigrants and thrived for the next five years. The SCC was the only Japanese American photography club to include both Caucasians and women photographers as members, and because of their inclusivity their members were among the most exhibited photographers in the world at that time.

== History ==
The 39 charter members of the club were all Japanese men. Unlike other prominent clubs of Japanese photographers, they decided at the beginning to welcome women and Caucasian members. The driving force behind the club's formation was Dr. Kyo Koike, who was a well‒respected medical doctor in Seattle's Issei community.

They held monthly meetings at 508½ Main Street near Dr. Koike's office. At these meetings members critiqued each other's prints and discussed current ideas about photography. Dr. Koike wrote about these discussions in their monthly bulletin, as well as descriptions of photography trips the members had taken, names of those members who had exhibited recently, and commentaries about photography in general.

The club's bulletin was called Notan, which is a Japanese term that roughly translates as "light and shade". These were qualities that defined the primary elements of a Japanese style of pictorialism that most of the original members prized. Many of their photographs contained strong lighting and rhythmical patterns that emphasized the artistic quality of a scene.

In 1925 the club began its own salon, which originally featured photographs by its own members but later expanded to an international field of photographers. The artistic strength of their membership is indicated by the fact that in 1926 members of the club showed a collective 589 prints in different exhibitions around the world. That same year Photo‒Era magazine offered a trophy for the photography club whose members won the most awards in the magazine's competitions. The first winner of the trophy was the Seattle Camera Club.

The club reached its peak membership in 1925 with 85 members, including several photographers who in lived in other areas of the country. Two prominent Seattle women, Ella McBride and Virna Haffer, were among the club's members by that time. Only one‒quarter of the members then were Japanese Americans.

Soon thereafter the membership in the club began to decline, primarily due to increasing economic difficulties that led up to the 1929 Great Depression. Many members held low-paying jobs, and with increased prices and a scarcity of jobs they could no longer afford to buy film or other photographic supplies. On October 11, 1929, the club held a farewell meeting. Only 7 members attended, and they formally disbanded the club at that time.

Some of the more well-to-do members, like Koike and Matsushita, continued to make photographs and exhibit them when they could. All of their efforts ended with the Japanese attack on Pearl Harbor in December, 1941. Soon thereafter almost all of the Japanese American community in Seattle was transported to the Japanese American internment camps in Idaho or Montana.

== Partial list of members ==
- Wayne Albee (1882-1937) Thought to have been an honorary member in an advisory capacity.
- Virna Haffer (1899-1974) A photographer, printmaker, painter, musician, and published author.
- Kyo Koike (1878-1947) - The originator of the club, he was a successful medical doctor who had a thriving practice in the Japanese community in Seattle. He underwrote many of the expenses of forming the club, and was editor of the club's newsletter Notan. He left all of his photographs and extensive records of the club to fellow member Iwao Matsushita.
- Frank Kunishige (1878‒1960) A founding member of SCC and one of only a few club members who had formal training in photography. In 1911 he attended photography school in Illinois, and after moving to Seattle he worked in the darkrooms of Edward Curtis and Ella McBride. Because of his training and experience he was one of the technical experts of the club. He created and sold his own photographic paper, Textura Tissue, which was a favorite of club members because it emphasized the soft qualities that Pictorial photographers prized.
- Kusutora Matsuki (1879-?) Matsuki, who favored small cameras, had noted pictures that appeared in Notan, Photo-Era and The New York Times.
- Iwao Matsushita (1892-1979) Matsushita helped preserve the Seattle Camera Club's legacy through his friendship with the head of the University of Washington Libraries Special Collections, Robert Monroe. Monroe acquired photos, archives and 8-mm films from Matsushita, the latter of which continue to be viewable in the lobby of the Henry Art Gallery.
- Ella E. McBride (1862-1965) A pioneering female fine-art photographer, she was a business partner to Albee, and an early mentor to Kunishige and Sunami. Although she had previously worked extensively on the business end of photography, she was already in her late 50s by the time she joined the club as a practicing artist. She lived to be over 100, and enjoyed a long and successful art career late in life.
- Yukio Morinaga (1888–1968) One of the more tragic stories of the SCC, Morinaga was embittered by his internment during the war, refused to pay taxes after his release, and eventually starved himself to death at age 80.
- Riichi Morita (1891–1975) The sixth-most exhibited member of the club in its early years, Morita was also a poet, who, later in life, published a book of poems together with his wife.
- Hideo Onishi (1890‒ ca. 1934) Employed as a restaurant cook, he was a prolific and very successful photographer. In 1926 he was the club's top exhibitor for the year, and that same year more than 1,000 people attended an exhibition of his photographs at the Japanese Commercial Club in Seattle. He sold 233 copies of his prints at that exhibition and gave the profits to SCC.
- Soichi Sunami (1885‒1971) He learned photography in Seattle while working as an assistant at the studio of Ella McBride. In 1922 he moved to New York to study at Art Students League, where there he photographed student dancers and artists. He also continued showing his photographs at SCC and was one of the most active non‒resident members of the club. Later he became of the main photographers for the Museum of Modern Art and continued to work there for 38 years.

== See also ==
- History of the Japanese in Seattle

== Sources ==
- Martin, David F.; Nicolette, Bromberg (2011). Shadows of a Fleeting World: Pictorial Photography and the Seattle Camera Club. Seattle: University of Washington Press. ISBN 978-0-295-99085-9.
- Reed, Dennis (2016). Making Waves: Japanese American Photography, 1920‒1940. Los Angeles: Japanese American National Museum. ISBN 978-1-943847-71-6.
- Tsutakawa, Mayumi (1993). They Painted from Their Hearts: Pioneers Asian American Artists. Seattle: Wing Luke Asian Museum. ISBN 0-295-97430-3.
