= Reginald Wilson (psychologist) =

American psychologist (1927–2020)

Reginald Wilson (February 24, 1927 – December 13, 2020) was an American psychologist who has served as Senior Scholar Emeritus at the American Council on Education since 1981. Prior to his appointment, Wilson was president of Wayne County Community College in Detroit for 10 years. He is the author of Think About Our Rights: Civil Liberties and the United States (1988) and other books, and editor of Race and Equality in Higher Education and other journals.

An award named after Wilson, the Reginald Wilson Diversity Leadership Award, was established in 2001 by the Board of Directors of the American Council on Education. It is awarded by the American Council on Education's Center for Advancement of Racial and Ethnic Equity. Dr. Wilson who was 93 is survived by his wife, Dianne K. Perry, PhD. and two children, Adam Wilson and Kafi Wilson.

== Bibliography ==
- Wilson, Reginald. A Comparison of Learning Styles in African Tribal Groups with Afro-American Learning Situations and the Channels of Cultural Connection: An Analysis of Documentary Material. 1971. Wayne State University, PhD dissertation.
- Wilson, Reginald. Race and Equity in Higher Education: Proceedings and Papers of the ACE-Aspen Institute Seminar on Desegregation in Higher Education. Washington, D.C: American Council on Education, 1982. Print.
- Wilson, Reginald. "Developing leadership: Blacks in graduate and professional schools." Journal of Black Studies 19.2 (1988): 163–173.
- Wilson, Reginald. "Women of color in academic administration: Trends, progress, and barriers." Sex Roles 21.1 (1989): 85–97.
