= Virna Haffer =

American photographer

- Born: 1899; Aurora, Illinois
- Died: April 5, 1974 (aged 74–75)
- Spouses: Clarence Schultz; Paul Raymond Haffer; Norman Randall

Virna Haffer (1899–April 5, 1974) was an American photographer, printmaker, painter, musician, and published author.

== Biography ==
Born in 1899 in Aurora, Illinois, Haffer and her family moved to the utopian community of Home in South Puget Sound in Washington state in 1907. When she was 15 years old Haffer became the apprentice of the photographer Harriette H. Ihrig. She opened her own portrait photography studio in Tacoma, Washington and began publishing her photographs in 1924. Haffer was known for experimenting with unusual, quirky techniques and created her own artistic style that stretched the boundaries of artistic classifications in the early twentieth century. Haffer's work was eccentric; she produced pictorialist, modern, surreal, and documentary style work.

Haffer was married three times, the second time to socialist and labor advocate Paul Raymond Haffer, with whom she had one son, Jean Paul Haffer. One of her works as a commercial photographic portraitist was a childhood picture of future glass artist Dale Chihuly.

Haffer's work was first exhibited in 1924 in the Fifth Annual F&N Salon of Pictorial Photography, and in 1928 at the Seattle Camera Club's Fourth International Exhibition. By 1930 her work was internationally recognized, and often appeared in publications such as the American Annual of Photography. In addition, she won recognition and prizes in photographic competitions in the United States in the 1930s. In the 1960s she took an interest in producing photograms, and in 1969 she published a book about the process called Making Photograms: The Creative Process of Painting With Light. Haffer's work was also the subject of several solo exhibitions at locations including the Massachusetts Institute of Technology, 1960; California Museum of Science and Industry, Los Angeles, 1964; New York Camera Club, 1967 and the Museum of Contemporary Crafts, NYC, 1968. A posthumous retrospective of her work, A Turbulent Lens: The Photographic Art of Virna Haffer, was produced at the Tacoma Art Museum in 2011.
