= Cascadia Art Museum =

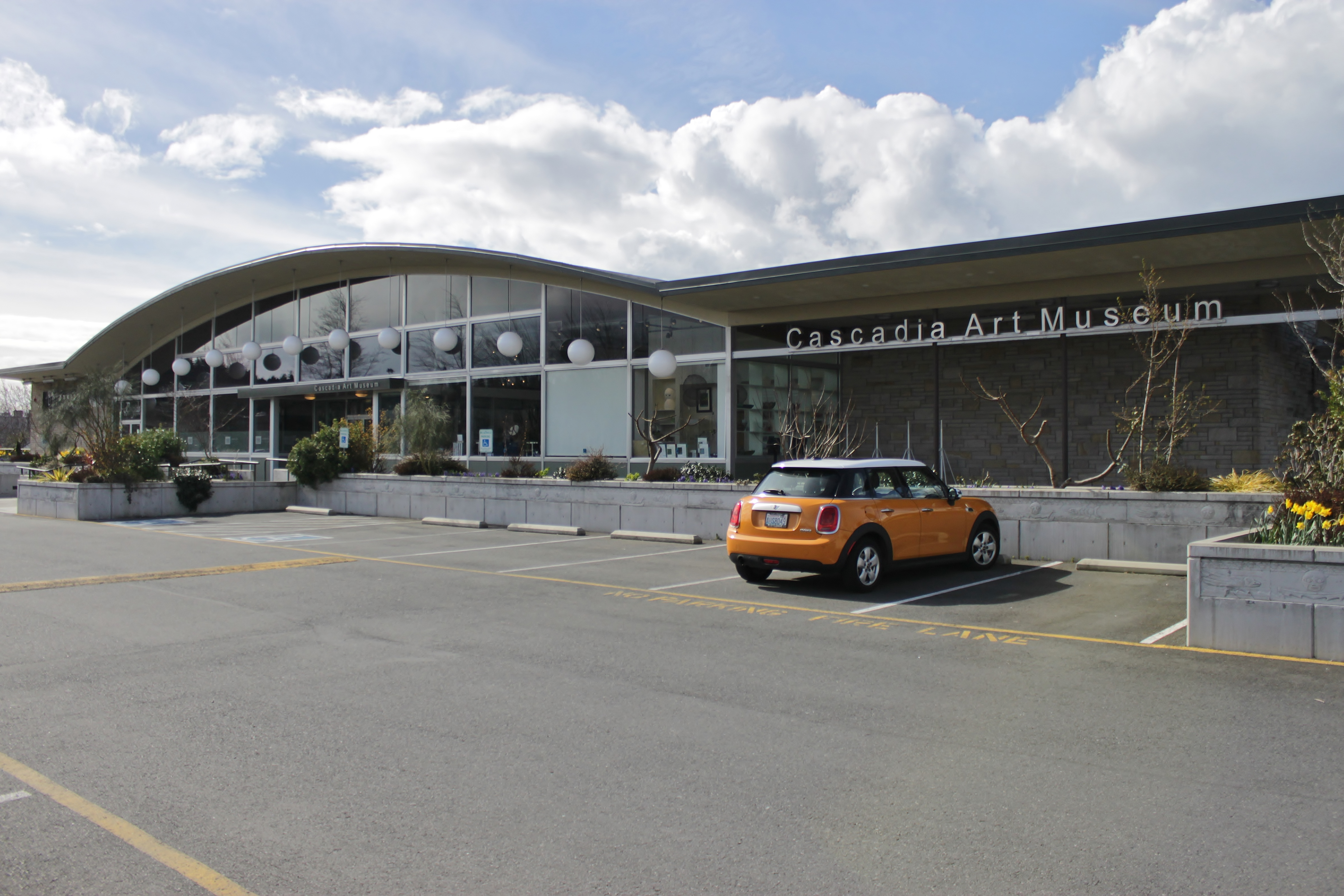
- Established: September 12, 2015
- Location: Edmonds, Washington
- Coordinates: 47°48′37.5″N 122°23′03.1″W
- Type: Art museum
- Collection size: 200
- Founder: Lindsey Echelbarger
- Curator: David F. Martin
- Website: cascadiaartmusuem.org

The Cascadia Art Museum is an art museum in Edmonds, Washington, primarily featuring art from the Pacific Northwest region of the United States. The museum opened in 2015 and has a collection of over 200 works.

== Location ==
The museum is located at 190 Sunset Avenue in downtown Edmonds, adjacent to the town's ferry terminal and train station. It is located inside a former Safeway grocery store built in the 1960s, sharing the building with several shops and restaurants. Once slated for demolition and redevelopment, it was bought by the Echelbarger family in 2012 to be renovated and modernized for new tenants. The retrofit exposed the building's timber frame and added wood elements sourced from the Pacific Northwest as an expression of the region's eco-consciousness.

== History ==
The idea of a museum for Pacific Northwest art was conceived by Lindsey Echelbarger during the acquisition of the Safeway building in 2012; Echelbarger had been collecting Northwest artists' work for decades prior. The museum opened on September 12, 2015, with an exhibit from the Northwest Watercolor Society. In its first year of operations, the museum hosted six main exhibitions and grew its membership to over 600.

== Collection and exhibits ==
The museum's primary focus is on artwork from the Pacific Northwest from 1880 to 1962, either from artists from the area or related to local places and events. Pacific Northwest art from this period, especially the years prior to 1930, has been largely forgotten by museums and collectors according to art historians. The region's artwork, according to curator David F. Martin, differs from the rest of the United States because of influences from Native American and East Asian culture. The museum features five galleries, which are divided into annual and quarterly rotations, and over 200 works that it leases and borrows from other collections.

The Cascadia Art Museum has featured works and exhibits from the Northwest Watercolor Society, Peggy Strong, Lance Wood Hart, Beulah Loomis Hyde and Northwest School artists John Matsudaira, Mark Tobey, and Morris Graves. The exhibits are curated by David Martin of the Martin-Zambito Fine Art gallery in Seattle.
