= Columbus Invitational Arts Competition =

Competitive arts event in Ohio, U.S.

The Columbus Invitational Arts Competition is a competitive arts event held annually in Columbus, Ohio, since 2012. The event brings together organizations selected for inclusion due to a combination of "artistic excellence and exceptional community involvement." In its first year the event drew participation from twenty-five local groups representing over three hundred individual artists, across four categories, Performing Arts, Visual Arts, Studio Recordings and Literary Arts. Literary Arts was eliminated in the second year and the divisions were further reduced to Performing Arts and Visual Arts for the third year, which was billed as a "regional" competition, and which drew participation from all five states surrounding Ohio (Indiana, Michigan, Pennsylvania, Kentucky and West Virginia). Organizers plan to hold the event at a national level by year six, and an international level by year ten.

== Judging ==
All divisions are judged by a panel including one (and only one) juror from each participating organization in that division. Each piece, regardless of division or genre, is evaluated independently by each juror according to a scoring rubric on a scale from 1 to 10 in each of three areas, creativity, craft and depth. Scores for each piece are averaged by area, refactored to prevent juror bias and then multiplied to produce a final score between 1 and 1000.

== Winners ==
=== 2012 ===
- Visual Arts – Mother Artists at Work, Columbus, Frayed Edges (758)
- Performing Arts – Transit Arts, Columbus, Hip Hop Dance with DJ BHB (746)
- Literary Arts – Paging Columbus, Columbus, Winter Break In (345)
- Studio Recordings – Flotation Walls, We Want Action, Columbus, Worms (331)

=== 2013 ===
- Performing Arts – Saints Drumline, Columbus (715)
- Visual Arts – Mother Artists at Work, Columbus, Totem (547)
- Studio Recordings – Nick Tolford & Company, WWCD, Columbus, Until I Walk Away (294)

=== 2014 ===
- Performing Arts – NoExit Performance (Indianapolis), The Red Couch
- Visual Arts – Mother Artists at Work (Columbus), Behind Closed Drawers
