= Black Creek =

Black Creek may refer to:

== Communities ==
=== In Canada ===
- Black Creek, British Columbia, on Vancouver Island
- A neighborhood in Fort Erie, Ontario
- Black Creek, Toronto
- Black Creek Pioneer Village, a historic site in Toronto
- Oil Springs, Ontario, known as Black Creek until 1858

=== In the United States ===
- Black Creek, Georgia, a community in Bryan County
- Black Creek, New York, a hamlet in Allegany County
- Black Creek, North Carolina, a town in Wilson County
- Black Creek Township, Ohio
- Black Creek Township, Luzerne County, Pennsylvania
- Black Creek, Wisconsin, a village in Outagamie County
- Black Creek (town), Wisconsin, a town in Outagamie County

== Streams ==
=== In Canada ===
- Black Creek (Ontario), one of 37 creeks of that name in Ontario, including:
  - Black Creek (Toronto), a tributary of the Humber River

=== In the United States ===
- Black Creek (Arizona), a tributary of the Puerco River, northeast Arizona
- Black Creek (Florida), a tributary of the St. Johns River in Clay County
- Black Creek (Ogeechee River tributary), a stream in Georgia
- Black Creek (Savannah River tributary), a tributary of the Savannah River in Georgia
- Black Creek (Minnesota)
- Black Creek (South Grand River tributary), a stream in Missouri
- Black Creek (North Fork Salt River tributary), a stream in Missouri
- Black Creek (New Jersey), a tributary of Pochuck and Wawayanda creeks
- Black Creek (Bozen Kill tributary), a tributary of the Bozen Kill in New York state
- Black Creek (Genesee River tributary), a tributary of the Genesee River in New York state
- Black Creek (Hudson River tributary), a tributary of the Hudson River in New York state
- Black Creek (Lehigh River tributary), a stream in Carbon County, Pennsylvania
- Black Creek (Nescopeck Creek tributary), a tributary of Nescopeck Creek in Luzerne County, Pennsylvania
- Black Creek (Susquehanna River tributary), a stream in Luzerne County, Pennsylvania

== Other ==
- Black Creek Park, in Monroe County, New York, USA
- Black Creek Nature Sanctuary, Keweenaw County, Michigan, USA
- Black Creek Wilderness, Mississippi, USA
- Black Creek Drive, a road that runs through Black Creek, Toronto, Canada

== See also ==
- Black River (disambiguation)
- Black Brook (disambiguation)
- Ribeirão Preto
