= Black Brook =

Black Brook may refer to:

== Places ==
- Black Brook, Nova Scotia, Canada
- Black Brook, New York, United States
- Black Brook, Wisconsin, United States

== Rivers ==
In England

- Black Brook (Chorley), a small river in Lancashire
- Black Brook, West Yorkshire, a small river near Calderdale
- Black Brook, Leicestershire, a tributary of the River Soar

In the United States

- Black Brook (Rum River tributary), in Minnesota
- Black Brook (Merrimack River tributary), in New Hampshire
- Black Brook (Passaic River tributary), in New Jersey
- Black Brook (Whippany River tributary), in New Jersey
- Black Brook (Seneca River tributary), in New York
- Black Brook (Beaver Kill tributary), in New York
- Black Brook (Susquehanna River tributary), in New York

== Nature reserves ==
- Black Brook Nature Reserve, Staffordshire, England

== See also ==
- Black Creek (disambiguation)
- Black River (disambiguation)
