= Emma Harris =

American-born Russian and Soviet actress

Emma Richardovna Harris-Mizikina
- Born: Emma Elizabeth Matthews; October 9, 1871; Augusta, Georgia, U.S.
- Died: December 31, 1940 (aged 69); Brooklyn, New York City
- Occupations: Dancer; singer; actress; interpreter
- Years active: 1901–1933
- Spouses: Joseph B. Harris (m. 1896–1907) Alexander Ivanovich Mizikin (m. 1911–1926)
- Musical career
- Genres: Spirituals, Russian Romance, Lieder, popular music
- Instrument: Vocals

Emma Richardovna Harris-Mizikina (Russian: Эмма Ричардовна Харрис-Мизикина; October 9, 1871, in Augusta — after 1940 in New York City; born Emma Elizabeth Matthews) was an American-born Russian actress, singer, dancer, cabaret artist, and writer.

== Early life and education ==
Harris was born to a poor Negro family in the southern city of Augusta, along Georgia's Savannah River, on October 7, 1871. At the end of the American Civil War in 1865, her parents, Sarah Green and Richard Matthews, left the Phinizy plantation to seek a better life and opportunities in the city. Green worked as a washerwoman, scrubbing clothes for the local white families, while Matthews labored daily in one of the city's numerous cotton processing mills. After Harris was born, two more children followed (Thomas, in 1873, and Josephine, in 1880).

By 1880, the family had settled in an old brick tenement on 319 Houston Street. Soon after, Harris began attending Edmund Asa Ware High School, the first public high school for African-Americans in Georgia. That summer, Harris was sent to Norfolk, Virginia, to live with her widowed Aunt Hattie Matthews to continue her studies and later attend the Negro Mission College, which opened in 1883. But a few years later, her aunt died, leaving the young Harris stranded in Virginia with no place to go. Instead of returning home, in 1892, Harris made her way to New York and found work as a chambermaid. On December 23, 1896, Harris met and married local janitor Joseph B. Harris. The couple settled into a small apartment in Brooklyn, where they hoped to start a family. She also assisted in bringing several of her relatives up from the South. After the sudden death of their only child, Harris began focusing on her singing career. Due to her staunchly religious parents' disapproval of her career as an entertainer, Harris began singing in the Trinity Baptist Church Choir and working as a domestic close to five years.

== Louisiana Amazon Guards (1901–1904) ==
Around April 3, 1901, while riding a trolley to work, Harris noticed that someone had left a copy of the New York Herald beside her. She saw an advertisement posted by German theatrical impresario Paula Kohn-Wöllner, seeking seven Negro women with the ability to sing and dance for a concert tour of Germany. Harris replied to the advert and was promptly accepted. Kohn-Wöllner, who had previously managed two theatrical troupes in the 1890s in Leipzig and Chemnitz, had made a trip to New York to visit her two married sisters, when she got the idea to organize a Negro theatrical troupe to tour across Europe. Soon the troupe consisted of Olga Burgoyne (a 26-year-old singer from the Oriental America show), Fannie Wise (a 19-year-old singer from Brooklyn), Florence Collins (a 26-year-old pianist from Kentucky), Alverta Burley (a 19-year-old from Baltimore), S.T. Jubrey (a 32-year-old housewife from Virginia) and Harris. Another girl, 20-year-old Corette Hardy, was also accepted, but it was decided that she was to be left behind as a replacement in case any of the women decided to quit the newly christened "Louisiana Amazon Guard" troupe. On April 10, the six women were brought to the Passport Office to apply for their first passports. After two weeks with Ms. Kohn-Wöllner paying for all six of the women's travel expenses, they boarded on the S.S. Deutschland, heading for Germany.

By April 21, the troupe had arrived in Leipzig, Germany. Throughout June and July, the troupe made a series of successful performances at Kaiserkrone and Carlsbad's Hotel Weber in Kiel. In late August, the women intrigued Hungarian audiences at the Os-Budavara fortress. In September, the women fulfilled a month-long engagement at Vienna's Colosseum Theater. The following month was spent at Copenhagen's Cirkus Variete for the beginning of their brief Scandinavian tour.

In November, the troupe spent two successful weeks at Goteborg's Circus Madigan and two more weeks at Stockholm's Svensalen Variety Restaurant. Between their performances, on November 11, Ms. Kohn-Wöllner conducted several interviews with the Svenska Dagbladet newspaper, frequently pushing forward Wise (dressed in a black and white dress). Ms. Kohn-Wöllner mentioned her plans to organize a band for the troupe, the contract she signed with the Folies-Bergere (for January 1902) and to bring over Hardy, who was still waiting in America. The troupe returned to Germany in December to entertain at Berlin's Circus Schumann where they ended the year, preparing for another year of extensive touring.

The new year of 1902, the group opened in Magdeburg for a two-week engagement before moving on to France, where the women intended to perform at Paris' famous Folie-Bergere cabaret. Unfortunately, it doesn't seem as if that ever came into fruition and the troupe returned to Germany to appear in Braunswich's Bruning Theater and Halle's Walhalla Theater. The month of March was spent in Breslau's Liebich Etablissement, followed by performances at Danzig's Wilhelm Theater and Poznan's Kaisergarten in April. In May, the group disappears briefly from the limelight as Fannie Wise and S.T. Jubrey suddenly quit the group and returned home to the United States. During this time their replacements, standby performers, Corette Hardy and Fannie Smith (20-year-old from Philadelphia) were promptly brought over to Europe. Throughout June, the troupe toured across Switzerland, performing in Zurich and St. Gallen before returning north to Germany. The month of July was spent at Munich's Deutsches Theater, followed by a month at Leipzig's Central Theater (September) and Dresden (October).

After twenty-one months of touring across Europe, during their Dresden engagement, the entire troupe walked out on their German impresario. Kohn-Wöllner was taken to court and accused of exploiting them financially. Lead performer Ollie Burgoyne was elected as their new manager and, now as the "Five Louisianas", the women left for Berlin, where they entertained at the Orpheum Theater and Harmonie Circus. After a brief engagement in Trier and Aachen, the group suddenly disappeared. In March 1903, Ollie Burgoyne and Florence Collins renewed their American passports and departed for London to join the cast of Hurtig & Seamon's In Dahomey, which opened on March 16 at the Shaftesbury Theatre.

The four remaining women continued performing around Germany for the next three months before departing for the Russian Empire. After receiving a passport from Berlin's American Embassy (July 10, 1903), the troupe traveled northwest to Saint Petersburg, to appear for two months at the popular Krestovskiy Garden Amusement Park, where they opened on July 19. On September 29, the troupe opened in Moscow at Aumont's French Theater for another two months billed as the "4 Ebony Belles". The focal point of Moscow's lively nightlife, located just west of Triumphal Square, the Aumont Theater was an entertainment garden occupying several park-like acres that was a relief from the more genteel and prosperous classes of society, who weren't put off by the frivolous nature of the establishment's entertainment. That evening, as the crowds made their way from the theater towards the open-air café chantant, the troupe joined twenty variety acts onstage varying from trained animals and acrobats to operatic singers. The theater director, Charles Aumont, was a successful yet ruthless French-Algerian businessman that renovated the gardens in 1898 to make visitors feel like they had visited a magical world. He was well known for exploiting chorus girls and female performers to allure the largely male audience. After their turn onstage, the head Maître d’ (an African-American man named, Frederick Bruce Thomas), informed the women that as singers, they would be called upon after their performance to entertain the private parties.

During the winter of 1903, the Louisiana Amazon Guard (Ebony Belles) finally dissolved. Alverta Burley married African-American entertainer, Oliver E. Brodie and the couple toured as "Brodie & Brodie". Harris convinced Coretté Hardy and Fannie Smith to remain in Russia with her and they formed the "Harris Trio". For the next six months, the trio performed between Saint-Petersburg and Moscow. In March 1904, the duo became the "Harris Trio" with the addition of Fannie Smith, and together they departed for Helsinki with an engagement at the illustrious Hotell Fennia, where Finnish high society enjoyed to mingle. During the summer of 1904, the Harris Trio, together with Ollie Bourgoyne and Jennie Scheper (from the Florida Creole Girls) formed a new company known as the "Creole Troupe" and continued touring the principal Russian cities. On January 22, 1905, while attending a party, hosted by popular American jockey, William Caton, in central Saint-Petersburg, the women witnessed the Bloody Sunday riots outside the Tsar's palace and across the city. The trio immediately packed up and returned to Moscow, where they resumed working at the Aumont Theater. In February, while performing in the city of Vyatka, the trio decided to dissolve and Corette and Fannie departed for Poland.

== The Black Nightingale (1905–1913) ==
Now as a solo artist, Harris returned to Helsinki in March 1905, performing for two weeks at the popular Princess Restaurant followed by two more weeks in the Finnish city of Tampere at the Seurahuoneen Sali. Shortly afterwards, she returned to St. Petersburg and Moscow, where she met a handsome, English-speaking scientist and museum curator named Baranov; soon afterwards the two became lovers.

Despite the revolution raging across the Russian Empire, Harris embarked on an extended Siberian tour that coincided with Baranov's own personal lecture tour across Russia's expansive Volga region. Baranov accompanied her everywhere acting as her manager and promised to accompany her on a trip to the United States the following year. Since trains hardly reached many parts of Russia, much of the journey was made using troikas and were often followed by hungry wolves. Harris later discovered that her Grand Duke was a charlatan. Baranov had been presenting her onstage as a singing African savage, manipulating and stealing her money after the show. Eventually, the couple arrived in the city Kazan. Located on the left bank of the Volga and Kazanka River and 520 miles east of Moscow, the former capital of the ancient Qazan Khanate was ravaged annually by many winters and summers; it was also modern compared to the numerous Germanic villages and towns that lined the Volga. As the educational and cultural center of Russia's vast Volga region, the city featured electric lighting, electric trams, telegraphs, telephones and the Kazan Imperial University. Desperate to escape, Harris attempted to flee from her abusive lover only to be seized by several Tsarist gendarmes who took her to jail. As the Russo-Japanese conflict was still raging, Baranov reported Harris to the authorities as a spy for the Japanese that was traversing across Russia under the guise of a performer. Eventually, an intervention from Moscow's American consulate allowed her to be released.

On September 2, the Russo-Japanese War ended, as the Russian Empire was forced to surrender to the Japanese. Scraping enough money by teaching English around Kazan, Harris boarded a train to Moscow, where she sought out Samuel Smith, who orchestrated her release from prison. The racist Smith was shocked to discover that he had aided a Negro woman from prison. Realizing she couldn't count on America for further help, Harris decided to scrap her plans to return the United States the following year and remain in Russia.

Early in 1906, a Baltimore businessman, Harry Leans, visited Russia and offered to fund Harris's first solo tour across the Russian Empire. Harris decided to keep the African persona that Baranov had created for her, becoming "Galima Oriedo: The Black Nightingale". She performed songs in German, French, Polish, and Russian. Her specialty was Russian romance songs, which were extremely popular in all of the major cabarets and theaters across the empire. In between her songs, Harris demonstrated her ability to play the flute and ocarina, as well as her ability to imitate the sounds with her voice. She quickly became a popular operatic singer and classical dancer in Moscow and St. Petersburg. During the course of her tour, Harris learned that her husband had died back in Brooklyn.

Around 1907 to 1908, Harris returned and became a popular fixture in Moscow, performing with popular African-American entertainer Edgar H. Jones. He had been touring around Europe for 17 years, having arrived in 1891 with the "Afro-American Specialty Company". In 1904, as his European career began to falter, Edgar began frequently appearing across the Russian Empire, spending little time home in Berlin, where his wife Amelia Jones and four children lived at Kleine Hamburgerstrasse 2.

1908 was full of success for nearly every African-American expatriate across the Russian Empire. In St. Petersburg, the former leader of the old Louisiana Amazon Guards, Ollie Burgoyne, was a popular headliner, as mistress to a Russian noble named Sasha who provided her with a mansion on the outskirts of the capital. Corette Alefred had married a Russian theater director and become Coretti de-Utina, a popular concert singer. In Moscow, Pearl Hobson, from the Florida Creole Girls, was a popular headliner at the illustrious Yar Restaurant. Also backstage at the Yar was waiter Frederick Bruce Thomas, back in Moscow following the revolution and employed at the restaurant as the new artistic director and Miss Hobson's manager.

During the summer of 1910, Harris appeared in the exotic city of Constantinople, as a start to a lengthy Turkish tour. The city reminded Harris of Moscow's oriental nature. She became such a sought-after entertainer that she was invited to Yildız Sarayı, the abandoned palace of Sultan Abdul Hamid II, to perform at the Imperial Seraglio. Performing at all the popular hotels and music halls, she mastered the exotic belly dances, known as Raqs Sharqi, which she soon showcased every night. She eventually became so popular that she was even invited to perform for the 12-year-old Shah of Persia, Ahmad Shah Qajar and his elderly uncle, Ali Reza Khan Azod al-Molk, who later died that September.

In January 1911, Harris returned from the Ottoman Empire for the beginning of a lengthy tour across the Caucasus Viceroyalty. In the Georgian city of Tiflis (now Tbilisi) she debuted at the Modern Theater. The following month, she was engaged at the Illusion Theater alongside a popular African boxer named Bomburo. During the summer of 1911, while in Tbilisi, Harris met a 28-year-old Russian peasant, Alexander Ivanovich Mizikin. Not long after meeting, Mizikin became Harris's manager and soon also her husband. Soon, Harris Russified her name, becoming Emma Richardsovna Mizikina (Эммы Ричардовна Мизикина). Under the management of Mizikin, Harris's public and stage persona developed away from an American vaudeville dancer into an exotic North-African dancer.

On January 6, 1912, billed as the famous Algerian Arab performer, Harris appeared in Rostov-on-Don for a two-week engagement at the Pel-Mel Cabaret (within the Maly Theater). By the spring, she was engaged in the Belarusian city of Braslav on April 15, demonstrating her musical abilities and exotic dances at the Theater Uvarova. That summer, the couple returned south to Ukraine, where they established a residence in Kharkov, the quiet provincial merchant city of 250,000 before a lucrative engagement at Odessa's North Hotel. The Kharkov Governorate, with a population of two million, was filled with various small cities and villages where the Russian merchants and peasantry conversed in Ukrainian, Russian, German, Yiddish, Belarusian, Polish and Tatar. The Kharkov county, which housed the Governorate capital of Kharkov, had a population of over 500,000. The Mizikin household settled in an apartment at 41 Edinovercheskaya Street, located in southern Kharkov's rough Moskalevska District. The district was modest compared to the rest of Kharkov: unpaved streets and alleys, 10 factories, 20 bars, numerous mudbrick houses and a few stone buildings scattered across the neighborhood. Despite residing in a working-class area, Harris strived to immerse herself into the aristocratic lifestyle that she'd witnessed across the Russian Empire, employing six servants and footmen.

In August, she was visited by her old acquaintance, 49-year old Negro comedian Edgar Jones, who was in the middle of one of his Ukrainian tours. After a brief visit, Edgar departed for the city of Lebedin (now Lebedyn) for a performance. On August 29, he died of heart paralysis and was buried in the Troitskaya Cemetery. Harris aided the governor of Kharkov and Odessa's American consulate in burying Jones and sending his possessions of clothing and musical instruments to his family in Germany. The following month, as anti-government protests raged across Russia, a double agent shot and killed Prime Minister Pyotr Stolypin while he attended a performance at the Kiev Opera House; the Tsar heard the shots himself.

The Romanov Tercentenary began in 1913 and marked the 300th anniversary of the Romanov dynasty, beginning with a week of receptions at the Winter Palace in February before the Imperial family took a pilgrimage in May to Moscow and the numerous cities that once occupied the ancient territory of the Grand Duchy of Muscovy. Harris spent the year touring across the various Ukrainian governorates. By May 1913, with the earnings from Harris's tours, Alexander purchased the popular Zerkalo Zhizni cinema from a man named G. Schmidt.

In July, she arrived in the governorate seat of Voronezh. Upon her arrival, Harris took the city by storm. She thrilled audiences for two days at the Fantasy Gardens and the Petrovsky Yacht Club. Newspapers printed positive reviews of the way she would open her act playing a flute and ocarina, before imitating those instruments with her ethereal voice. Then, after performing a series of Russian romances, she began dancing her exotic snake-like Algerian dances which sent audiences into a frenzy. In early October, Harris was in Odessa performing at the popular North Hotel, which had been renovated the previous year, adding a permanent music hall in the gardens behind the hotel.

During her engagement, Ophelia Gindra, daughter of an Austrian millionaire, fled to Odessa's North Hotel to elope with her boyfriend, who quickly abandoned her upon arrival. During this time, Gindra witnessed the Black Nightingale perform her exotic routine in the garden café-chantant. Harris took Gindra under her wing and helped her get employment as a singer at the hotel. However, the director fired Gindra after her first performance, and Harris frequently attempted to encourage Gindra to return home to Austria. On October 11, after Harris's engagement at the hotel ended, the women arrived at the train station to return to Kharkov. While waiting in the train station waiting lounge, Gindra committed suicide by consuming potassium cyanide, dying within seconds. Fearful, Harris immediately called the police before boarding her train home.

Back home in Kharkov, Harris was engaged at the Kommerchesky Garden Club on 21 Rymarskaya Street. The main hall was supplied with a stage and an orchestra pit, where the Black Nightingale performed her act. On October 17, the New Odessa and Morning of Kharkov newspapers announced that Harris's apartment had been raided, as it was suspected that she had stolen money and a feather ostrich boa from Gindra's personal belongings. After an ostrich boa was discovered, Harris claimed that she had purchased matching ones with Gindra. Harris was promptly arrested and sent back to Odessa to be questioned at the American consulate. She was soon cleared of all charges, released, and allowed to return home.

On November 14, Kharkov's Southern Edge (Yuzhny Kray) newspaper announced Harris's performance at the Zerkalo Zhizni Theater: "In the theater "The Mirror of Life" a performance will be held at the present time by the great artist Ms. Galima, the same mulatto who, in Odessa had to endure quite a few troubles. Ms. Galima has a beautiful voice and an extremely original repertoire."

== Film career and the Russian Revolution (1914–1917) ==
On February 4, 1914, the electricity shut off at the Zerkalo Zhizni Cinema and chaos ensued. Outside an angry crowd gathered and Alexander calmed them, refunding their money and promising everyone one film free of charge the following day. Several months later, on May 9, Harris performed at her usual stomping grounds, the Kommerchesky Garden Club (May 9–15).

On June 28, 1914, Gavrilo Princip assassinated Archduke Franz Ferdinand of Austria in Sarajevo, setting in motion the events leading to the outbreak of World War I. On July 25, according to later passport, Harris revisited Moscow, possibly taking an opportunity to visit Frederick B. Thomas. Thomas (now using the Russified version of his name, Fyodor Tomas) had become the owner of the Aumont Theater in 1911 and had converted it into Moscow's popular amusement park, the Aquarium Garden Theater. Besides its various entertainment establishments, the park also held private residences, hotels, cafes and cinemas. The latest attraction at the Aquarium was Jack Johnson, America's Heavyweight Champion, who was preparing for a boxing tournament between Johnson and M. P. Tsarev that was initially to be held on July 28. However, the tournament was called off due to the news of chaos coming from other parts of Europe. Harris would have witnessed off-duty army officers spending time at the Aquarium, sipping champagne, staring at the chorus girls, and some of them meeting and dining with Johnson.

On August 1, Germany declared war on Russia, and on August 3, France. As the Russian Empire prepared for mobilization, Johnson and his wife caught the next train to Paris. Harris herself promptly returned home to Kharkov and began liquidating her various properties.

On September 1, the Tsar declared that St. Petersburg would from then onwards be known as Petrograd. Russian high society began basking in what would be the Russian Empire's last year and Russian society's greatest season. There was a feverish desire to have a good time to combat the undercurrent of nervousness. It was a large distraction upon newspapers reporting on October 29 that the Ottoman Empire had attacked Russia. All of Petrograd indulged in wild partying, amusement and merrymaking before the Tsarist government initiated prohibition that November; alcohol was banned for the remainder of the war. One highlight of the year was Countess Shuvalov's black and white ball, with the uniformed Chevalier Gardes in attendance. Many people spent their evenings out at the opera and attending parties. Harris entertained at the popular establishments, watching everyone dancing and drinking.

Two months after the start of the war, Turkish warships shelled cities on the southern coast of Russia, including Odessa. In response to this, the Mizinkin household relocated to Moscow, where Harris had purchased a comfortable apartment on 12 Bol'shoy Kozikhinskiy Pereulok, in the center of the city. Also living in the apartment building was the popular Russian actor from the Maly Theatre, Alexander Ostuzhev, who was appearing successfully in the production of V. Sardu's "Graf de Rizoor". Fyodor Tomas’ Aquarium Garden establishment was less than ten minutes away on the Bolshaya Sadovaya.

Lonely in the middle of Moscow without her husband and unable to tour due to the war, Harris decided to embark on a film career. After writing a scenario together with directors Sigmund Veselovsky and Parkomenko, Harris traveled to the G.I. Libkin Studios in Yaroslavl to star in her debut film Satan's Woman (Zhenshchina Satana). Released May 15 by the Alians Film Office, the 5-hour, 1350 meter film was an interesting attempt on Russian soil to create an intricate American adventure-drama.

In the film, "Famous circus actress Gaia Assi (Ge-de-Gayam), a charming and beautiful woman, enjoys great success with men. Not loving anyone except her devoted Arab Emerita (Harris, credited as Galima Oriedo), she pursues one goal – to fall in love. However, no one touches her suffering and the cold laughter of celebration meets hot recognition of its victims. On a ride she meets a banker who is fond of her, she also meets and soon conquers the heart of the engineer Lamanca, who saw her performance in a circus. Entertainer Yevgeniy Tolsky (Nikolai Saltykov), former lover of Miss Assi, was terribly jealous of her new banker lover. Gaia still possessed affection for Tolsky, much to the chagrin of Emerita who was deeply in love with him.

The banker walks in on Gaia kissing Tolsky, however, Gaia recovers her relationship with him by inviting everyone to a party at her home. She also asks that Tolsky bring along his brother Andrei (Lihomsky), a popular sculpture artist. At the party, guests demand that Gaia dance and she performs the dance of fire much to the delight of everyone. While Gaia spent much of the evening snuggling up with her banker, the sculptor Andrei realizes she is the woman of his dreams and wants to sculpt statues of her. Tolsky overhears his brother and an argument ensues. Eventually, the banker gets in involved and Tolsky challenges him to a duel. Tolsky injures the banker and returns to the party to search for Gaia, only to find her embracing Andrei. Rushing out from her bedroom, Emerita attempts to comfort Tolsky. Unfortunately, he pushes her away, locks himself in the next room to commit suicide. Hearing Emerita's cries, Gaia and Andrei discover the horrible tragedy that has occurred. Emerita embraces the cold body of her dead love interest, blaming his death on Gaia and Andrei.

Disgusted, Andrei loses interest in the beautiful dancer and immediately decides to seek revenge on his brother. Conspiring with a friend, Andrei kidnaps Gaia in an automobile to an abandoned cellar. They're unaware that Emerita had followed behind them in a taxi and finds a way to rescue her starving friend from the cellar. As the women escape, they're followed by the men until the pursuers get caught in a car accident. Later on, while Gaia is home entertaining a new potential lover, Andrei sneaks into her home and poisons the coffee right before she begins serving refreshments. Gaia, in agony from the effects of the poisoning, is approached by Andrei who declared that he was once in love with her but now was lost to him. During his speech, Gaia used the last of her energy to grab a dagger and murder Andrei before she also succumbed to death."

Harris became an overnight sensation due to the success of the film.

That summer at Moscow's Aquarium Garden, Fyodor Tomas sold tobacco, then sent the proceeds to the troops in the war. Elsewhere, bazaars were organized to sell items to raise money for the troops. On June 12, for the first time in five years, Harris renewed her American passport, although there were discrepancies, as she claimed to have been born in Washington, D.C., in 1886.

Before the year was over, the Kinolent Film Office released the comedy film, Feet Up! (Nogi Vverkh), in which Harris starred alongside actor Tikhomirov. It was directed by Boris Kramskoy, who also held the main role within the film.

In 1916, to supplement an income, the Mizikin home doubled as a high-class brothel that serviced soldiers and aristocratic clientele.

By the beginning of 1917, Harris decided to follow in the footsteps of her husband and attended Bolshevik rallies and meetings across Moscow. Unfortunately, during a public demonstration held in Moscow sometime in January 1917, Harris witnessed armed gendarmes fire upon the crowds and was soaked in blood as a man beside her was murdered. On February 6, she renewed her American passport, expressing a wish to travel to neutral Scandinavia.

After the February Revolution and with Russia in a dire situation, Harris's artistic career was suddenly interrupted and, like the rest of the American expat community, she pondered at the idea of returning to America. The war and revolution had abruptly ended Russia's importance on the continental theatrical circuit. Extensive touring was impossible and many Russian establishments began shutting down. The vast majority of the African-American community in Russia were rushing to Petrograd's American embassy and Moscow's consulate to apply for passports to sail across the Black Sea towards Turkey and Romania or board Trans-Siberian trains towards Manchuria and Japan in their journey back to America. However, from letters she received from friends such as Ollie Burgoyne, Saidie Sellyna and Ida Forsyne who had returned home to America, she was able to learn about the changes in the American entertainment scene. The majority of black establishments only wanted light-skinned Negro women, and Harlem cabarets had women perform shake dances in between the tables and mingle with the audiences as jazz played in the background. Such activities didn't happen in Russian cabarets and music halls. Most of the successful Negro performers returning to America from Europe found themselves suddenly penniless and turning to domestic work. By May, Russia was already adapting to the country's new political reality, although most activities continued as before. However, Moscow's police forces were disarmed and disbanded by the rebels. The Provisional government declared broad civil liberties. It also pardoned all political prisoners, including terrorists; in addition, about two thousand thieves and murderers were released from prisons in Moscow. The city was flooded with a wave of crime – there was looting in the streets and attacks on houses and businesses. Even the Mizikin residence was looted; the thieves got away with many valuables, including Harris's American passport. The new city militia, which consisted mainly of volunteer students, was ineffective, and homeowners were forced to organize their own associations for mutual protection.

Throughout the course of the October Revolution, Harris and her fellow brothel girls banded together and tended to the wounded Bolsheviks that they dragged inside from the daily street skirmishes. By the end of the week, dozens of buildings in the center of Moscow were damaged by shots from rifles, machine guns and artillery fire, including the most revered cathedrals in the Kremlin itself. On November 20, the Moscow Military Revolutionary Committee proclaimed its victory, declaring that the Cadets and its other opponents had surrendered or been killed. On November 29, Harris used her connections to gather the ingredients to produce a large Thanksgiving feast for American Consul Maddin Summers and the remnants of Moscow's dwindling American Consulate staff.

Harris was running out of time to leave. The Bolsheviks did not want people to slip out from under their power, and everyone who wanted to leave Moscow had to get a special permit. Train traffic throughout the country had deteriorated greatly: the schedule became irregular, tickets were in short supply, rolling stock was deteriorated, and delays became frequent due to engine failure. In addition, getting on a train in Moscow did not guarantee the achievement of the destination. At each station, many people tried to get on the train that the passengers had to fight for their seats. Harris enlisted with the Red Cross, serving as a nurse aboard armoured train no. 1045 that traversed south into the Ukraine.

== Russian Civil War (1918–1925) ==
As soon as Harris returned home to Moscow, on March 3, 1918, the newly formed Soviet Union backed out of the war after signing the Brest-Litovsk Treaty. Ten days later, 30,000 German and Austrian troops marched into Ukraine. By mid-March, the Germans were already in Odessa and the new puppet state became known as the Hetmanate. The region became terribly dangerous; besides the Red Army attempting to push out the Germans, the Ukraine's notorious criminal gangs (their brazen behavior comparable to Chicago's gangsters) began a reign of terror with nightly burglaries and murders in the streets. On March 11, as Moscow was declared the new capital of Soviet Russia, Lenin and the Soviet government arrived from Petrograd, hastily settling themselves in the city. Harris attended a rally held in Red Square, where Lenin gave a powerful speech. Standing on Skull Place before St. Basil's Cathedral, Lenin was explaining the meaning of the Bolshevik cause when he spied Harris at the front of the crowds. Extending his right hand, he spoke directly to Harris, "The ideal communist is to open the road for all the downtrodden races of the world. For you, comrade, especially, as we regard your race the most downtrodden in the world. We want you to feel when you come to Russia that you are a human being. The Red Army is ready to give its life at any time for all the downtrodden races!" Immediately the crowds hoisted Harris up upon their shoulders and bore her triumphantly through the cheering audience.

Around this time, Harris had purchased a 15-room house located at 4 Kalanchevskaya in eastern Moscow's working class Krasnaya Vorota neighborhood. The five-story Art Nouveau style house, designed by the architect Alexander Nikiforov and built between 1875 and 1880, was located in the railroad-infested Krasnoselsky district. As usual, the sumptuously decorated house was kept in order by a team of servants and also doubled as a brothel.

Due to the deteriorating health conditions in Moscow, cholera and typhoid began to spread. Moscow was also on the verge of starvation; the main food products were issued on the cards, and prices on the black market were too high. Inevitably, the stations in Moscow became one of the main places where buyers and sellers met. Living between Moscow's three major railroad stations, Harris became a frequent black market shopper, having very little issues due to her numerous connections to Russia's criminal underground. Her connections also proved to be valuable when the Bolsheviks' new Cheka secret police began targeting private residences to confiscate, rob and extort the bourgeoisie. Across the city, homeowners and tenants were often thrown into the street as representatives of the new order drove into their houses and apartments. It was certainly interesting that throughout the course of this plundering, a popular African American actress was able to maintain control over her massive home in the heart of Moscow.

That summer, Harris found herself unemployed. No longer the wealthy aristocrat she once was, she now listed in the category of the declasse bourgeoisie. The Soviet government began liquidizing and nationalizing all of its theaters, cabarets and music halls. Even the once popular Aquarium establishment was being occupied by a local military garrison. Besides earning enough income from her successful brothel, she soon found employment with the Narkompros. Shortly after the October Revolution, the old system of education and culture management was deposed and the new system, gradually and with great difficulty, was created. With the establishment of Soviet power, teachers, university professors and cultural figures were unable to find a common language for the development of education and culture in the new Soviet Union. In response, the People's Commissariat of Education (Narkompros) was organized.

Much of 1919, Harris was sent east to Simbirsk with a delegation of the Narkompros to aid in the establishment of educational and cultural centers. Her primary job was that of an interpreter and English teacher to Soviet officials. Simbirsk (now Ulyanovsk), a bustling provincial city on the banks of the Volga and Sviyagi rivers with a population of nearly 64,000, was on the frontlines of the Russian Civil War's Eastern Front. Due to the Civil War, the city was in ruins, local industry was disrupted due to a lack of fuel, tools and raw materials. Street lighting disappeared, boulevards and parks were neglected, houses were destroyed, and bazaars and shops were abandoned. Not far from the city, Commander Jan Blumberg and his 5th Army armed with 10,000 men, 42 guns and 142 machine guns held off the White Army's Western Army led by Mikhail Hanzhin. Since February 7, the city had been the headquarters of the Revolutionary Military Council (headed by Commander Sergei Kamenev and Sergei Gusev), leaving the city swarming with military personnel.

Anti-revolutionary in sympathy, during her sojourn in the city, Harris became involved with various White Army military officers, aiding them in their schemes against the new Soviet government. During the summer of 1919, after Simbirsk was briefly captured by the Czechoslovak Legion, she returned home to Moscow, continuing to work with the White Army, offering her Moscow home as a hiding spot and meeting place for them. On September 24, the Cheka raided the Mizinkin residence where they discovered numerous soldiers holed up. The entire group (including Harris) were swiftly arrested and taken to the infamous Lubyanka Prison. In 1918, the Council of People's Commissars was liquidated and nationalized. Around May 1919, the building was transferred to the Special Section of the Moscow Cheka. While Harris sat quietly in her cell, the White Guard soldiers were executed by firing squad. On November 19, Harris was brought before a Cheka official, who was looking into her case. She immediately denied any knowledge of the counterrevolutionaries, claiming she was simply running a legitimate business and didn't engage in politics with her clientele. The official replied, much to her surprise, "You know the only reason we didn't shoot you was because you’re a Negro. You’re free to go now. I advise you to find some useful work. Keep out of trouble." Harris was promptly released.

On February 11, 1921, the People's Commissariat of Education was dissolved. Shutting down her successful brothel, Harris converted her mansion into a comfortable American pension, where she housed Red Cross officials, journalists and other Westerners. Being located between three major railway stations, she soon managed to arrange for all the railway information bureaus to immediately direct all visiting Americans to her establishment.

That summer, after the Civil War finally drew to a close, a Famine raged across the Volga region known as Russia's breadbasket. In September, when the American Relief Association, Colonel Haskell, arrived in the Soviet Union to aid the Russians in their fight against famine, Harris organized a laundry service for the ARA relief workers based in Moscow, while Alexander delivered the wash and called for it. During this time, Harris reunited with her old friend, Coretté Alefred (now Coretti Arle-Titz), who had recently returned to Russia from the Ukraine with her new husband Boris Titz. The couple decided to reside in Moscow instead of Petrograd, which had once been Coretti's stomping grounds. The two women most likely hadn't seen each other since 1917 and Harris would have been extremely shocked upon hearing Coretti's false tales she spun to Soviet newspapers, including one story that she originated from Mexico, among other tales.

In late 1922, Ukrainian-born American journalist of the New York World, Samuel Spewack and his wife Bella, traveled to Germany and the Soviet Union, where they resided for the next four years. On September 9, during their surjourn in Moscow, Samuel paid a visit to the Mizinkin residence only to be shocked to discover that despite the Revolution, nationalization, Civil War and the raging famine, Harris was able to maintain possession of her fine collection of rugs, massive jewelry, silks and silverware. In between cooking, Harris rambled on (in fluent Russian) about her days as an exotic dancer, performing for the Shah of Persia, her disappointment that she could no longer move nimbly as she once could since her waistline had increased, and also expressed her desire to return to the United States. Her husband, Alexander, also chimed in, expressing his desire to travel to America as well to write scenarios for Hollywood films.

== Soviet worker (1926–1933) ==
1926 marked the end of Harris's career as a successful actress as she sought employment as a textile worker at the Proletarsky Trud Silk Mill. This new shift in her life also marked the end of her fifteen-year marriage with Alexander Mizinkin, who moved out some time later. In the meantime, the Soviets finally seized control over her magnificent mansion, gave Harris two rooms on the first floor, and converted the remaining rooms into apartments, which ten Russian families soon inhabited. With all six of her servants dismissed, Harris was frequently accompanied by a Lithuanian servant, one of her former prostitutes, who provided assistance when Harris built an improvised kitchen in the common corridor of the building, where she spent hours busy with pots and pans cooking hash, pork and beans, beef stew, cabbage and ham hocks, fried chicken and cornbread. Although her American boarding house was gone, Harris continued providing southern hospitality to every visiting American that she came across. "Just supply me the rubles, I’ll find the stuff", she would say to any American that wanted a home-cooked meal. The early groups of African-Americans, such as Harry Haywood, who arrived in April 1926, quickly grew fearful spending time around Harris. Now classified by the Soviets as a declassé bourgeoisie, she was extremely bitter about her present situation and frequently criticized the Soviet regime, meanwhile praising the old Tsarist system. She was often recalled saying, "I'm like a cat with nine lives, honey. I always landed on my feet...been doing it all my life wherever I been. These Bolsheviks ain't gonna kill me."

In late 1928, an American communist from Idaho, James Pierce, arrived at the Soviet Union for a five-year stay in Leningrad and Moscow. By September, he secured a room at Kalanchevskaya 4, eventually becoming very close with Harris. Her apartment had become a regular Saturday evening meeting place of American expats. In between serving home-cooked meals, Harris pounding out jazz numbers on her piano, coupled with her melodious singing, added a dash of color to the drab grey Russian winter.

During the 1930s, Harris became one of the lead speakers for the International Red Aid (MOPR), travelling Russia and giving fiery speeches protesting against racism, singing spirituals and writing poems for Soviet newspapers.

On June 26, 1932, Harris, Coretti Arle-Titz, Robert "Bob" Ross and Robert Robinson gathered at Nikolayevsky Station to welcome twenty-two Afro-American artists that were invited to the Soviet Union to produce a film depicting Negro laborers in their difficult working conditions in the American South. The film was based on Vladimir Mayakovsky’s 1925 poem, Black & White, which protested American racism and imperialism. The film was sponsored by the Comintern and was to be produced by the Russo-German film company Meschrabpom. Harris pushed towards the front of the crowd of government officials, writers and actors while shouting, "Bless God! Lord! I’m sure glad to see some Negroes! Welcome! Welcome! Welcome!" She spent the majority of her time entertaining her new colleagues at the Hotel Metropol, eventually receiving a role in the film. Other times, the group traveled over to the Krasnaya Vorota district, where Harris entertained them from the comfort of her home. She washed their dirty laundry and prepared supper for them. Harris had some of the best food in Moscow and yet had only an ordinary workers’ ration card, but she knew all about the black markets and speakeasies. In a city where almost nothing was open after midnight, Harris could always find a place to buy a drink. Her clientele was mostly American, however, because her Russian neighbors had no money to supply the ingredients. During his visits, Langston Hughes noticed her neighborhood was a smoky, smelly, noisy area, and he often complained about why she remained living there. "Man, you ain't seen no rooms for rent signs, have you?" she answered. But she added, "If anything busts loose against them Bolshies, I'm gonna highball out’a here on the first and fastest train out of one of them stations for anywhere on the down line."

During the first week of July, an Anti-Scottsboro rally, organized by the International Red Aid, was held at the Park of Rest & Culture, where Harris, her face illuminated by the blazing floodlights and voice magnified by loudspeakers, performed a number of spirituals and delivered a fiery speech in fluent Russian before the masses. Not long after the disappointing reality that Black and White wasn't to be, Harris found herself employed as a saleswoman for one of Moscow's Torgsin shops, where she was frequently seen leaving with a bulging bag filled with cooking ingredients and vodka, which she called "Russian corn whiskey".

In early 1933, while employed as the chief correspondent for the Stankoimport State Trust, the long years of Russian exposure failed to remove much of Harris's deeply-ingrained American values, which frequently caused her to become overcome with nostalgia. As she grew older, her desire to see America grew stronger, and when the United States finally recognized the Soviet Union during the summer, the American consulate helped to arrange for her return to New York. That August, after an interview mentioning a wish to visit the US, Harris was granted permission to travel to Latvia to receive an American passport before boarding the S.S Milwaukee from Hamburg, back to New York after 32 years.

== Later life (1934–1940) ==
Harris was invited to several functions across New York City speaking of her success and experiences in Russia, up until February 1934, when she was suddenly hospitalized and placed in a nursing home due to her failing health. In December 1937, during an interview with journalist Theodore Poston, she mentioned that she was no longer interested in remaining in the United States, slowly saving funds to return home to the Soviet Union. Unfortunately, she was unable to return and, by 1940, she had moved to Brooklyn, living with her nephew, Richard Matthews, and his family, where she remained, hoping to return to Russia after the war, until her death.
