= Black Russian (disambiguation) =

Black Russian is a cocktail comprising vodka and coffee liqueur. It may also refer to:

- Black Russian Terrier, a breed of dog
- Black Russian, a type of Sobranie cigarette
- Black Russian, a variety of tomato
- Members of the African diaspora who emigrated to Russia
- Frederick Bruce Thomas, Mississippi native and the son of former slaves who became a prominent citizen of Moscow and, later, Constantinople
- Black Russian, a Motown-label band in 1980
- Black Russians, an armed group in the Central African Republic
