= Churchville, New York =

- Village
- Location in Monroe County and the state of New York

- Location of New York in the United States
- Coordinates: 43°06′20″N 77°52′50″W
- Country: United States
- State: New York
- County: Monroe
- Town: Riga
- Founded: 1806
- Incorporated: March 7, 1855
- Named for: Samuel Church

Government
  - Mayor: John T. Hartman
  - Deputy Mayor: Diane Pusateri

Area
  - Total: 1.21 sq mi (3.13 km^{2})
  - Land: 1.19 sq mi (3.08 km^{2})
  - Water: 0.019 sq mi (0.05 km^{2})
- Elevation: 577 ft (176 m)

Population (2020)
  - Total: 2,091
  - Density: 1,756.5/sq mi (678.17/km^{2})
- Time zone: UTC-5 (EST)
  - Summer (DST): UTC-4 (EDT)
- ZIP Code: 14428
- Area code: 585
- FIPS code: 36-15638
- Website: churchvilleny.gov

Churchville is a village in Monroe County, New York, United States. As of the 2020 census, the population was 2,091, up from 1,961 in 2010. The village is named after Samuel Church, an early settler.

== History ==
In 1806, Samuel Church purchased the land that would become Churchville in what was then known as West Pulteney. The village was incorporated on September 21, 1852, and named after Samuel Church, who owned all the land within the village limits.

The village expanded following the conclusion of the War of 1812 —which Samuel Church himself fought in— hastened by the connection of the Tonawanda railroad in 1837.

== Geography ==
Churchville is at 43°6′20″N 77°52′50″W (43.105462, -77.880533) in western Monroe County, in the northern part of the town of Riga. It is at the intersection of Routes 33 and 36, north of Interstate 490. I-490 leads northeast 16 miles (26 km) to downtown Rochester and southwest 6 miles (10 km) to I-90, the New York State Thruway. State Route 33 leads northeast 4 miles (6 km) to North Chili and southwest 3.5 miles (5.6 km) to Bergen, while Route 36 leads north 6 miles (10 km) to Route 31 near Spencerport and south 10 miles (16 km) to Caledonia.

According to the U.S. Census Bureau, the village of Churchville has an area of 1.2 square miles (3.1 km^{2}), of which 0.02 square miles (0.05 km^{2}), or 1.49%, are water. Black Creek, a tributary of the Genesee River, flows from west to east through the village.

Churchville Park and golf course are north of the village near Hutton Circle and Kendall Road.

== Demographics ==
Historical population
Census	Pop.	Note	%±
1880	513		—
1890	493		−3.9%
1900	505		2.4%
1910	565		11.9%
1920	513		−9.2%
1930	652		27.1%
1940	601		−7.8%
1950	755		25.6%
1960	1,003		32.8%
1970	1,065		6.2%
1980	1,399		31.4%
1990	1,731		23.7%
2000	1,887		9.0%
2010	1,961		3.9%
2020	2,091		6.6%
U.S. Decennial Census

=== 2020 census ===
As of the 2020 census, Churchville had a population of 2,091. The median age was 48.3 years. 17.7% of residents were under the age of 18 and 21.2% of residents were 65 years of age or older. For every 100 females there were 84.6 males, and for every 100 females age 18 and over there were 79.2 males age 18 and over.

0.0% of residents lived in urban areas, while 100.0% lived in rural areas.

There were 974 households in Churchville, of which 26.5% had children under the age of 18 living in them. Of all households, 50.1% were married-couple households, 12.2% were households with a male householder and no spouse or partner present, and 31.4% were households with a female householder and no spouse or partner present. About 29.9% of all households were made up of individuals and 14.0% had someone living alone who was 65 years of age or older.

There were 1,009 housing units, of which 3.5% were vacant. The homeowner vacancy rate was 0.7% and the rental vacancy rate was 3.9%.

Racial composition as of the 2020 census
Race	Number	Percent
White	1,976	94.5%
Black or African American	33	1.6%
American Indian and Alaska Native	0	0.0%
Asian	22	1.1%
Native Hawaiian and Other Pacific Islander	0	0.0%
Some other race	12	0.6%
Two or more races	48	2.3%
Hispanic or Latino (of any race)	36	1.7%

=== 2000 census ===
As of the census of 2000, the village had 1,887 people, 723 households, and 514 families. The population density was 1,662.7 inhabitants per square mile (642.0/km^{2}). There were 753 housing units at an average density of 663.5 per square mile (256.2/km^{2}). The village's racial makeup was 96.34% White, 0.74% African American, 0.11% Native American, 0.90% Asian, 0.05% from other races, and 1.85% from two or more races. Hispanic or Latino of any race were 0.42% of the population.

There were 723 households, out of which 36.9% had children under the age of 18 living with them, 58.5% were married couples living together, 9.7% had a female householder with no husband present, and 28.8% were non-families. 24.8% of all households were made up of individuals, and 10.7% had someone living alone who was 65 years of age or older. The average household size was 2.59 and the average family size was 3.10.

In the village, the population was spread out, with 27.6% under the age of 18, 6.6% from 18 to 24, 31.9% from 25 to 44, 22.8% from 45 to 64, and 11.0% who were 65 years of age or older. The median age was 36 years. For every 100 females, there were 90.8 males. For every 100 females age 18 and over, there were 85.1 males.

The village's median household income was $55,357, and the family median income was $63,333. Males had a median income of $45,667 versus $31,563 for females. The village's per capita income was $23,190. About 2.8% of families and 4.2% of the population were below the poverty line, including 3.0% of those under age 18 and 10.7% of those age 65 or over.

Main Street, 1895

== Education ==
Churchville is served by the Churchville-Chili Central School District.

== Government ==
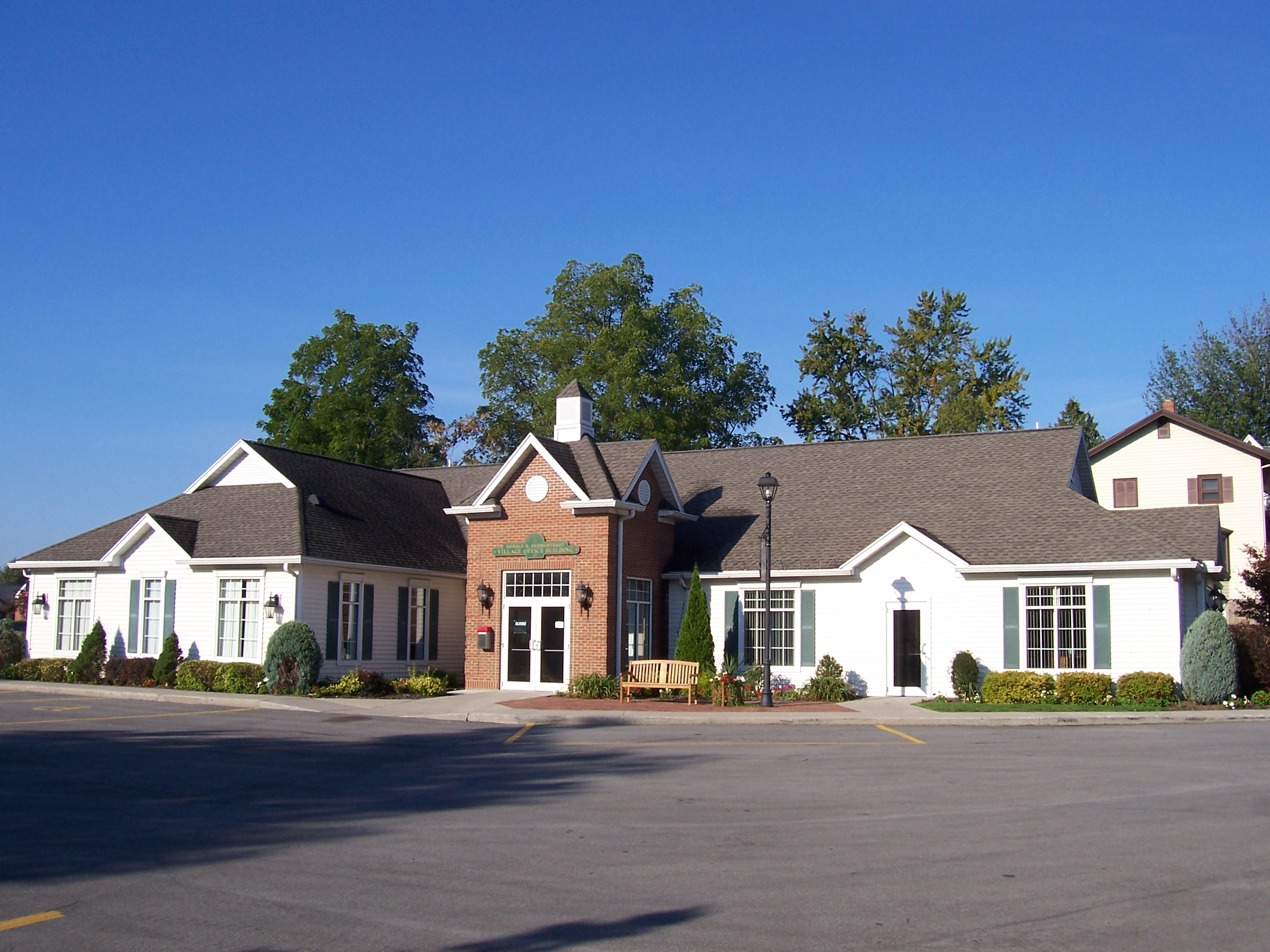
Churchville village offices

As of April 2024, the village is governed by Mayor John T. Hartman, Deputy Mayor Diane Pusateri, and three trustees: Michael Brown, Scott Cullen, Julie Michalko.

The village conveens a planning board every second wednesday of each month, as well as a zoning board of appeals every 4 months or as necessary.

== Noted residents ==
- Charles S. Baker, former US congressman
- Renée Fleming, opera performer
- Floyd R. Newman, founder of Allied Oil Company
- Tim Redding, former pitcher in Major League Baseball
- Jenn Suhr, Olympic gold medalist in pole vaulting
- Coretti Arle-Titz, jazz, spiritual, and pop singer
- Lyndsay Wall, women's ice hockey player, Olympics silver and bronze medal winner
- Frances Willard, women's rights and temperance leader
