= Black Creek Park =

Park in Monroe County, New York, United States

Coordinates: 43°04′20″N 77°48′30″W

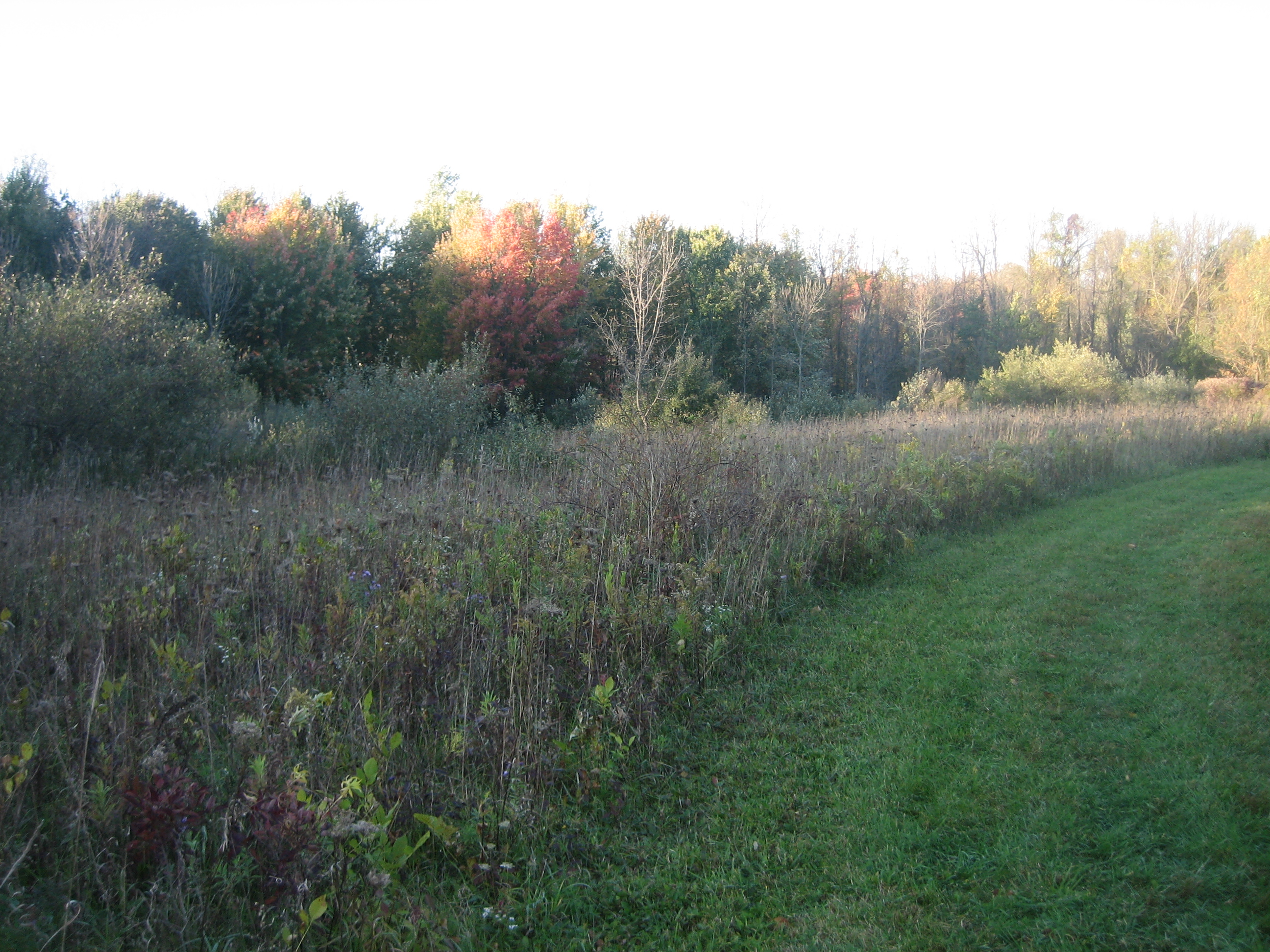
Wetlands Trail in Black Creek Park in October

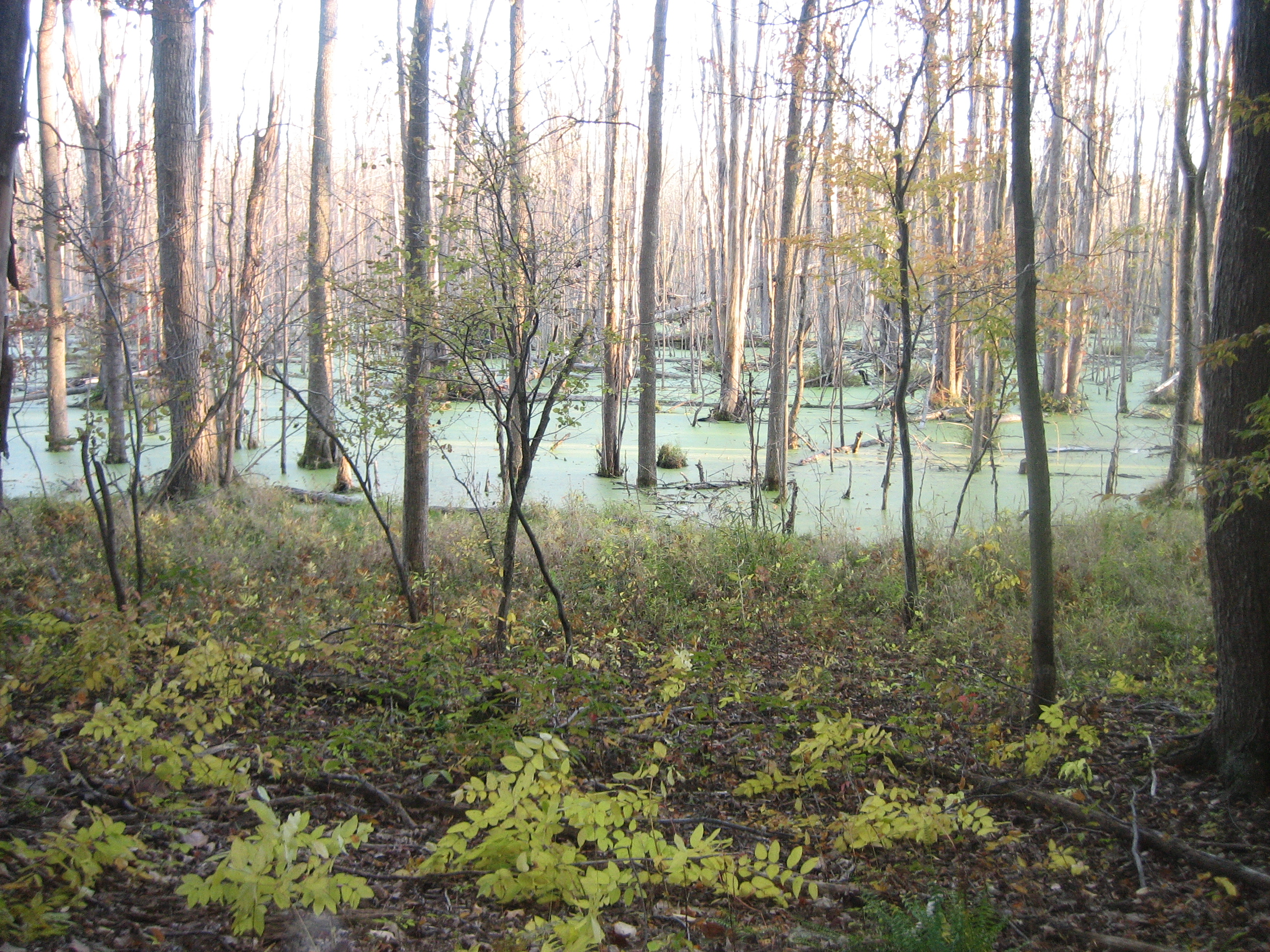
Mill Creek swamp in the Black Creek Park.

Black Creek Park is a park in Monroe County, New York, about ten miles (16 km) southwest of the city of Rochester. It is a relatively undeveloped 1,505-acre (6.09 km^{2}) park operated by Monroe County, including soccer and baseball fields, as well as a number of trails for hiking, horseback riding, cross-country skiing, and snowshoeing; picnic areas, a sledding hill, and two enclosed lodges. The current foreman is Ed Britton.

The main entrance is at 3835 Union Street, south of Chili Avenue (Route 33A), in Chili, New York.

Black Creek runs across the north edge of the park, and wetlands associated with the Mill Creek cross the park near the south side. The Chili Historical Society is located at the southeast edge of the park (entrance on Union Street).

In the spring of 2018, the local volunteer trail management group #TrailsROC installed a Fairy Trail on a brand new path near the Woodside Lodge. The intention for the trail is to be a community place for families. The trail is about 1 mile long, and in the spring of 2019, has about 40 Fairy Houses.
