= Black Creek (Ogeechee River tributary) =

Stream in Georgia, U.S.

Coordinates: 32°07′42″N 81°24′28″W

Black Creek is a stream in the U.S. state of Georgia. It is a tributary to the Ogeechee River.

Black Creek's name is an accurate preservation of its native Creek name, Weelustee ("black water"). A variant name was "Weelustie Creek".
