= Black Creek (Minnesota) =

Stream in St. Louis County, U.S.

Coordinates: 47°57′37″N 92°35′38″W

Black Creek is a stream in St. Louis County, in the U.S. state of Minnesota.

Black Creek was named from the fact peat darkens its waters.

== See also ==
- List of rivers of Minnesota
