= Black Brook, Nova Scotia =

Locality in Nova Scotia, Canada

Coordinates: 46°12′58.28″N 60°25′48.45″W

Big Ridge in Nova Scotia

Black Brook is a locality in the Canadian province of Nova Scotia, located in the Cape Breton Regional Municipality on Cape Breton Island.
