= Olga Burgoyne =

Harlem Renaissance actor, dancer and businesswoman (1878–1974)

- Born: June 13, 1878; Chicago, Illinois, United States
- Died: April 2, 1974 (aged 95); Oxnard, California, United States
- Occupations: Actress, dancer

Olga “Ollie” Burgoyne (June 13, 1878 – April 2, 1974), also known as Ollie Burgoyne-Calloway, was an American dancer, actress and businesswoman who gained popularity during the Harlem Renaissance. Although one of the lesser-known African-American figures in entertainment, she was one of the eight most significant African-American dancers and choreographers during this time, amongst Katherine Dunham, Hemsley Winfield and Edna Guy.

== Biography ==
Burgoyne started her stage career in 1901 at the early age of six when she began performing in minstrel shows. In 1903, she performed in Vaudeville with the Seven Creole Girls and in her later career, continued to perform in this genre with her own company, the Burgoyne Musical Company. As her career progressed, she explored her vaudeville talents and mastered oriental dances internationally in Germany, Turkey, France, Denmark, Switzerland, Hungary, Egypt and Sweden.

Burgoyne continued to make a name for herself through song and dance during her eight year tour of Europe. She returned to the United States in 1909. Following 1909, she crossed the Atlantic 15 times before settling in Russia. There, she resided in St. Petersburg for 14 years. As she became a well known entertainer, she developed the reputation of a "fire cracker". She was also given the opportunity to perform for the nobles of the country. While in Russia, she danced to earn a living. With her earnings, she purchased and owned an elegant lingerie shop called Maison Creole and employed 27 workers. Although famous for her performances, Burgoyne was also given the reputation of a stern business woman. In addition to this, other business credits include the management of Ward Calloway’s Hotel.

When she returned to the United States, her ‘exotic dancing’ such as The Snake Dance and the Brazilian and Spanish Dance trademarked as her most memorable movement qualities. As a result of the 'remarkable ease of her arm and hand motions as well as the gracefulness in her sways', theatrical critics have styled Burgoyne as “the peer of any dancer in the world regardless of color.

=== Later life ===
In the later part of her life, Burgoyne taught Russian dancers and worked in the movie industry with a small feature in the romantic comedy film, Laughter (1930). Her career spanned nearly 50 years and during this time, she made an extraordinary mark on the entertainment industry.

At the age of 95, Olga "Ollie" Burgoyne died on April 2, 1974, in Oxnard, California.

== Important Contributions ==
- Burgoyne joined the British-based cast of In Dahomey; an operetta written and performed by all black writers and entertainers. In Dahomey was the first full length musical to be performed at a major Broadway house. After its massive success, Burgoyne created an ongoing duet performance called Duo Eclatant with her partner Usher Watts.
- In 1901, German impresario Paula Kohn-Wollner assembled a group of seven women that made up the "Louisiana Amazon Guards". This vaudeville troupe of black artists (six performers and one ‘reserve’) included Ollie Burgoyne, Fannie Smith, Emma Harris, Virginia Shepard and Coretté Alefred 一 as well as a few other unknown members. The women traveled to Germany and booked their first performance with Herr Director A. Walter in Kiel. They were considered to be "the black Uberbrettl".

Description of Show and Quoted Reviews
First Scene: Leben und Treiben auf einer Baumwoll-Plantage (Hustling and Bustling on a Cotton Plantation”	"...so much beauty as far as the plot and the clever scenery” Sfft- [=Seiffert], July 21, 1901
Second Scene: Banjo-Serenade	“The lighting effects for this act are nothing less than grandiose and this scene passes by just like a fairy tale” Sfft- [=Seiffert], July 21, 1901
Third Scene: The Cake-Walk	

Additional Reviews:

“The Creole girl Bourgogne, an exotic beauty with sparkling eyes, a teint of soft bronze and dazzling white teeth, performs with a strange charm the favourite dance of her American home, the cake-walk..” -A.B, 6 October 1907

“...The pretty appearances of the six coloured ladies, and particularly their excellent voice material一a special mention is due to the splendid first soprano一 give the troupe the stamp of a unit which will cause a sensation in the world of variety. The many changing scenes which accommodate the need for both the serious and the comic are designed in such a clever and effective way that even the daughter from the girls school could be taken out to see the show. The costumes, the scenery and last not least the music一which latter has benefitted from the gifted hands of our Capellmeister Th. Walther一have been designed in such an elegant way that only words of highest praise could be used to describe them”. -Sfft- [=Seiffert], 21 July 21, 1901

“We have to admit it: We were surprised by the achievements of the American girls. We never expected so much charm and grace from the black ladies. The dance act really captivates the public but nevertheless decency has been maintained throughout…” -Sfft- [=Seiffert], 21 July 21, 1901

“...The young negresses are really one of the best song-and-dance ensembles of to-day…” -Viktor Happrich, 8 December 1901

There is no reference of the Louisiana Guards after 1902. Some suggest that the group may have changed its name. There is speculation that the group, "Louisiana Troupe" and/or The "5 Louisianas" may be an offspring of the original.

== Broadway Features/Productions ==
Burgoyne appeared in ten Broadway productions between 1926 and 1937. A few of her most well known credits include, Tired Businessman, Lulu Bell and The Constant Sinner.

=== Performance Credits and Notes ===
In Dahomey	Written by Bert Williams and George Walker. Toured in London in 1903 after performances in New York City
Follow Me (1923)	Developed by Mamie Smith
Lulu Belle (1926)	As Mabel De Witt (Broadway original) Opened February 9, 1926
Tired Business Man (1929)	As Juanita (Broadway original) Opened June 3, 1929
Make Me Know It (1929)	As Mirandy (Broadway original) Opened November 4, 1929
Laughter (1930)	Short film feature
The Constant Sinner (1931)	As Clara (Broadway original) Opened September 14, 1931
Blessed Event (1932)	As Mme. Fleurette (Broadway original) Opened February 12, 1932
Run, Little Chillun (1933)	
The Perfumed Lady (1934)	As Eva Mordecai (Broadway original)
All Rights Reserved (1934)	As Minnie (Broadway original) Opened November 6, 1934
Kiss the Boys Good-Bye (1938)	As Maime (Broadway original) Opened September 28, 1938
