= Ida Forsyne =

African-American vaudeville dancer

Ida Forsyne (January 1, 1883 – August 19, 1983), sometimes seen as Ida Forcen, or Ida Forcyne, was an African-American vaudeville dancer who toured in Europe and Russia before World War I. Professionally she was known as the 'Queen of the Cakewalk'.

== Early life ==
Ida Forsyne was born on South Side, Chicago, Illinois in 1883, and raised by her mother. The family lived across the street from the Alhambra Theater so Forsyne would watch shows from the fire escape, she recalled in an article in 1953. By age 14, Forsyne ran away to join a tab show called the Black Bostonians Coon Town 400. She sang a lullaby called "Drowsy Babe" as a duet with performer Rosie Grayson. Forsyne was stranded in Montana when the show ran out of money, and her mother arranged for her and one other performer to be sent home.

== Career ==
In 1898, at age 15, Forsyne joined Black Patti's Troubadours, a touring musical comedy group built around concert singer Sissieretta Jones. Forsyne's credits included named character roles in The Filipino Misfit (1902), Darktown's Circus Day (1903), and Cooney Dreamland (1904). In these roles, she performed song and dance numbers.

Outside of her work with Black Patti's Troubadours, Forsyne worked with other theater troupes. She joined the Smart Set Company ensemble in 1902.In the spring of 1904, Forsyne joined the cast of Will Marion Cook's The Southerners, one of the first interracial Broadway musicals. Though African American cast members did not have named or speaking roles, Forsryne had a dance solo.

Forsyne traveled to Europe after joining a troupe of performers known as The Tennessee Students in 1905. When the group debuted in London the following year, she appeared on the cover of the performance program billed as "Topsy." Following the success of The Tennessee Students, Forsyne spent much of the next decade in Europe under the management of the Marinelli Agency. She spent a year at the Moulin Rouge, then spent several seasons touring music halls in the United Kingdom. In London at the Alhambra Theater, Forsyne introduced her sack dance, in which she danced in a potato sack in front of a chorus line of ballet dancers in blackface.

An energetic version of the kazatsky dance was her specialty, which she developed during a run in Moscow, in 1911. "I stole all the steps I could. I liked Russian dancing so much as I wanted to be different than most colored performers," she recalled. and was hailed the "greatest Russian dancer of them all." Although Russian style dancing was done before her in the United States’ vaudeville circuit, Forsyne brought it to the forefront.

She stayed abroad until just before World War I in 1914. Upon her return to the United States, Forsyne joined the cast of Darkydom, a musical review which premiered at the Lafayette Theater in Harlem during the fall of 1915. She was an ensemble cast member in the musical comedy They're Off (later revived as Derby Day in Dixie.), which premiered in Chicago. She appeared as a dancer in several touring productions during 1920 including Town Top-piks, Beale Street to Broadway, and Strutt Your Stuff, the latter of which say Forsyne perform a solo number "Hold Me."

In her 30s, Forsyne found it difficult to gain dance jobs. In addition to age, she believed her darker skintone was a barrier to employment, even in all-black shows, due to what she called "Black prejudice." For example, when Forsyne returned to New York City, she auditioned but was not hired at Harlem nightclubs such as the Cotton Club, Connie's Inn, and the Nest because of their preference for light-skinned chorus girls.

From 1920 to 1922, Forsyne worked as a personal maid, both onstage and off stage to vaudeville performer, Sophie Tucker. At the end of Tucker's performances, Forsyne would come out as a dancer to drum up applause. New rules on the Keith Circuit prohibited Black performers to appear on stage with white performers unless they were in Blackface. Additionally no Black performer was allowed to watch the show. Tucker refused to have Forsyne perform in Blackface but did allow her to watch the show from offstage.

In 1924, she returned to the Theatre Owners Booking Association Black vaudeville circuit. She traveled with Mamie Smith in 1924, Dusty Fletcher in 1925, and Bessie Smith in 1928. On the circuit with Bessie Smith she earned $35 a week and was able to reprise some of her Russian dances. She left in 1928 and vowed never to tour the South again.

Forsyne retired from dancing in the early 1930s but stayed involved in the arts. Though she worked as a domestic servant and elevator operator, she also appeared in a few films, including A Daughter of the Congo an Oscar Micheaux movie, Birthright in 1938, and the 1936 film, The Green Pastures. In 1951, Forsyne assisted Ruthanna Boris in the choreography of the New York City Ballet's "Cakewalk," by George Balanchine. There was a birthday tribute event to Forsyne in 1955, which allowed her to show off her dance skills in her seventies. In the 1960s, Forsyne was interviewed by oral historians of dance, Marshall Stearns and Jean Stearns.

== Personal life ==
Her cousin Ollie Burgoyne was also a dancer in vaudeville shows and on Broadway, who also toured extensively overseas. They appeared together in a 1919 show, They're Off. Forsyne was active with the Negro Actors Guild in her later years.

Forsyne had three husbands: James Frank Dougherty, Usher Henry Watts and Arthur Belton Hubbard.

Ida Forsyne died at age 100, in a nursing home in Brooklyn, New York.

== Bibliography ==
- Lori Harrison-Kahan, The White Negress: Literature, Minstrelsy, and the Black-Jewish Imaginary (Rutgers University Press 2011): 35. ISBN 978-0-8135-4782-4
