= Black Brook (Susquehanna River tributary) =

- Location of the mouth of Black Brook

Location
- Country: United States
- State: New York
- County: Otsego

Physical characteristics
- Source
  - coordinates: 42°40′15″N 74°54′44″W
- Mouth: Susquehanna River
  - coordinates: 42°38′38″N 74°57′10″W
  - elevation: 1,161 ft (354 m)

Black Brook is a river in Otsego County, New York. It converges with Susquehanna River south-southwest of Cooperstown.
