= Black Brook (Rum River tributary) =

Stream in Mille Lacs County, Minnesota, U.S.

Coordinates: 46°03′38″N 93°39′37″W

Black Brook is a stream in Mille Lacs County, in the U.S. state of Minnesota. It is a tributary of the Rum River.

Black Brook was named for its peat-stained water.

== See also ==
- List of rivers of Minnesota
