= Black Creek (South Grand River tributary) =

Stream in the American state of Missouri

Coordinates: 38°30′05″N 94°21′23″W

Black Creek is a stream in Cass County in the U.S. state of Missouri. It is a tributary of the South Grand River.

Black Creek is a southeast and northeast oriented South Grand River tributary located west and north of Archie in the figure 5 east center

Black Creek has the name of one Mr. Black, a pioneer settler.

== See also ==
- List of rivers of Missouri
