= Black Creek (Bozen Kill tributary) =

River in United States of America

Coordinates: 42°43′14″N 73°59′41″W

Black Creek is a stream in the U.S. state of New York. It is a tributary of the Bozen Kill.

Black Creek was named from deposits of black shale in its creek bed.
