= Frederick Bruce Thomas =

American businessman

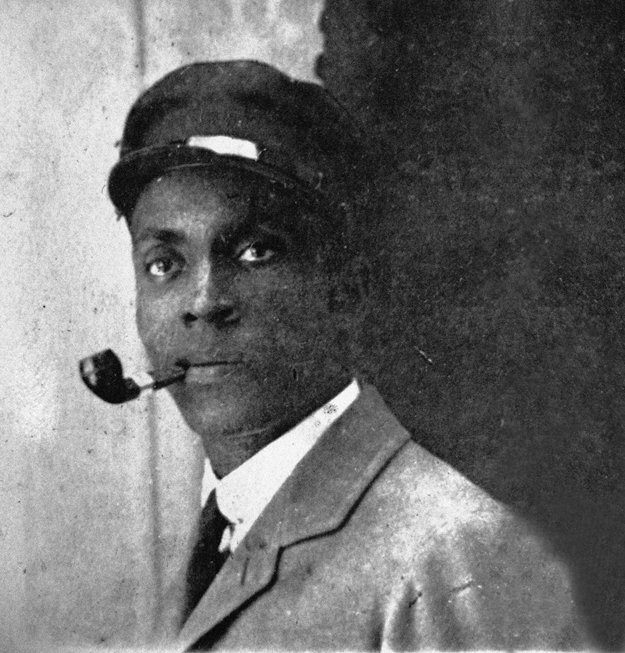
Frederick Bruce Thomas, c. 1896, Paris

Frederick Bruce Thomas (Russian: Фёдор Фёдорович Томас, romanized: Fyodor Fyodorovich Tomas; November 4, 1872 – June 12, 1928) was an American from Coahoma County, Mississippi who became a prominent businessman in the entertainment industry of Moscow and, later, Istanbul.

Thomas was born to former slaves Lewis and Hannah Thomas, who owned a farm in Coahoma County. After his father was murdered, he left Mississippi for London, intending to work as a waiter but then moved to Russia, where he prospered and owned and operated a number of successful theaters and restaurants for 19 years. During the Russian Revolution, he fled to İstanbul Turkey, where he had less success in business and went into debt. His passport request was denied by US consulate due to his slave past and he was unable to return to the United States and died in a debtor's prison. He was buried in the Pangaltı Catholic Cemetery in Istanbul.
