= Black Creek (Genesee River tributary) =

- Location of the mouth of Black Creek in New York

Location
- Country: United States
- State: New York
- Region: Western New York
- Counties: Wyoming, Genesee, Monroe

Physical characteristics
- Source
  - location: Middlebury, Wyoming County
  - coordinates: 42°51′40″N 78°06′29″W
- Mouth: Genesee River
  - location: Henrietta, Monroe County
  - coordinates: 43°05′40″N 77°40′48″W

Basin features
- River system: Genesee River

Black Creek is a tributary of the Genesee River that runs for 46 miles (74 km) in western New York, United States. The creek begins in Middlebury in Wyoming County and runs north for roughly the first half of its course and east for the other half, eventually joining the Genesee River in Chili, Monroe County. Its drainage area spans around 202 square miles (520 km^{2}), which is largely rural and agricultural. As of 2000, 40,000 residents lived in the creek's drainage area.

== See also ==
- List of New York rivers
