= Ollie Fitch =

American-born Dutch actress

- Born: Arlethia Gertrude Fitch; 14 September 1880; Staunton, Virginia, U.S.
- Died: 1 July 1950 (aged 69); The Hague, Netherlands, U.S.
- Occupations: Dancer, singer
- Years active: 1902–1940
- Spouse: Jakob August Jensen (m. 1912–1922)
- Musical career
- Genres: Spirituals, Ragtime, Lieder, popular music
- Instrument: Vocals

Ollie Fitch (14 September 1880 in Staunton – 1 July 1950 in The Hague) was an American-born Dutch singer, dancer and cabaret artist.

== Early life ==
Arlethia Gertrude Fitch, better known by her childhood nickname, Ollie, was born on September 14, 1880, in Stauton, Virginia to Elizabeth Davidsen and William Fitch. The couple also had an elder daughter, Pearl (born 1875/1877). Alethia's parents never seemed to have married, as 23-year-old Ms. Davidsen was listed in the 1880 US Census as a single mother, with housework listed as her source of income and residing at 138 Jackson Alley with her infant daughter, Arlethia.

In February 1892, shortly after the death of William Fitch, Ms. Davidsen and her daughters relocated north to Brooklyn, where her mother Ellen Davidsen and sister Mamie were living.

In 1900, the Davidsen household, according to the 1900 Census, were residing in the comfortable Fort Greene neighborhood at 435 Carlton Avenue. Ms. Davidsen was employed as a domestic for a local white family and 19-year-old Alethia, employed as a stenographer. Pearl, now 25 (or 23), lived in the nearby Clinton Hill neighborhood at 385 Clinton Avenue, where she was employed as a live-in servant for the Irish O'Flyn family.

== Career ==
=== Florida Creole Girls (1902–1903) ===
During the summer of 1901, French actress, Nina Diva, wife of the Austrian millionaire Baron Erlanger organized the Fencing Musketeers (also known as the Fencing Octoroons and Les Mousquetaires Noirs) consisting of eleven black women, which after two months of rehearsing, opened at New York's Circle Theater (October 26, 1901). The show consisted of lead performer, Jennie Scheper (born 1877 in Washington DC), who had come from the Sons of Ham show. There was also, Bidie Hall (born 1882 in Dunkirk, NY), Edith Adams (born 1876 in Indianapolis), Pearl Hobson (born 1879 in Lisbon, VA), Mattie Stafford (born 1870 in Norfolk, VA), Minnie Brown (born 1884 in Chicago, Il), William H. Ward (born 1876 in Salisbury, MO), Jennie Ward and of course, Ollie as well as two other unnamed women. In January 1902, the show played Boston's Howard Theater (January 12–18) and New York's Garden Terrace.

On February 5, 1902, the troupe departed from Philadelphia aboard the SS Belgenland, arriving 4–5 days later in Liverpool. By the time the show reached Europe, it had lost a member and was advertised as the 10 Fencing Musketeers Company. Early February through March, the toured across Germany, appearing in Bremen, Kiel and Hamburg. On April 14, while appearing in Copenhagen's Arenatheatret, the women applied for passports at the US Embassy. Later the women appeared in Stockholm's Svea-Teatern (May 1–5) and Budapest (June–July). On July 5, while appearing in the Hungarian capital, the furious women attacked their manager for not paying as a much as they were promised. The fighting became so severe that Hungarian police had to intervene.

Afterwards, the women reappeared that October in London, now managed by Geraldine de Grant, a German impresario who renamed them, Die 7 Florida Creols Girls sending them off to continue touring across the continent. The troupe later moved on to Düsseldorf's Apollotheater, Leipzig's Kristallpalast, Brussels, Amsterdam's Rembrandt Theater (November 24 – December 9) and Rotterdam's Casino Variete.

In January 1903, the troupe opened in Paris at the Casino de Paris (January 1 – February 23), where they were praised for their extraordinary demonstration of the Cakewalk. So popular were the women, that they were photographed at Studio Waléry, who distributed their photos as postcards for eager European and American tourists. During their sojourn in the French capital, the troupe quickly began to dissolve. Mattie Stafford quickly became a popular French attraction, Bidie Hall began her solo tour and Edith Hall probably returned to America. The remaining quartette, continued on with a month's engagement at Vienna's Ronacher Theater (March 7–31) and two weeks at Budapest's Municipal Orpheum Theater (Apr.1–15). In June, the troupe finally reached the vast expanses of Imperial Russia, appearing at a popular café-chantant in Moscow. Unfortunately, in Russia, every theater is under the power of the police. Nothing can be said or done against their wishes, and if the wish to stop any performance, why they stop it, and that is all that there is to it. The police saw their first performance and allowed them to go on. However, after their tenth performance, the police have stopped them, saying that the American cake-walk was too suggestive. On July 4, the American Consul, Samuel Smith, invited all the American performers who were in Moscow to a celebration on the grounds of the consulate. The program included, the Manhattan Quartette, Smith & Doretto, Weston of loop the Hoopology, Miss Walcott, the Florida Creole Girls Quartette and Harry Houdini (who wrote about the women in his diary).

Afterwards the troupe moved on to appear in St. Petersburg and Riga's Hagenstalna Wafaras Teatris (August 18–23). In October, the troupe were in London, appearing at the Royal Holborn Theatre before finally completely dissolving and the women joining Will Marion Cook's noted black musical comedy In Dahomey. Eventually, Minnie Brown returned to Germany and Jennie Scheper adopted the pseudonym, Madagascar Girl and departed for her own solo tour.

=== La Olliette (1904–1911) ===
At the beginning of 1904, as the Russo-Japanese War raged, Ollie and Pearl Hobson returned to St. Petersburg to pursue their solo careers. On April 15, she visited St. Petersburg's American Embassy and applied for a new passport. Immediately afterwards, she began traversing across the Russian Empire as a popular American variety artist around music-halls between St. Petersburg, Odessa and Moscow. On January 22, 1905, a large public demonstration outside of the Tsar's palace escalated into the Bloody Sunday riots. Chaos quickly ensued across the Imperial capital and soon across the Russian Empire. Throughout 1905, serfs and radicals took to the streets and engaged in armed struggle with soldiers and the gendarmerie, sailors of the Potemkin battleship mutinied at the Black Sea port of Odessa. Tsar Nikolai badly misjudged the Russo-Japanese War in the Far East, which soon lost public support and exposed the many weaknesses of the Russian military and political institutions. Defeat at the hands of 'inferior' Asians served to speed up public unrest that was becoming so serious that the Tsar was forced to end the war with the Treaty of Portsmouth on September 5, 1905. To overcome the heartbreak due to the loss of the war, St. Petersburg was overcome with forced gaiety, which Ollie joined in.

Throughout the summer of 1906, violence raged throughout Russia, prompting many of the elite to flee to the comfort of their country homes. Soon, these same estates were being torched and pillaged nightly, sometimes entire villages would out for the looting. On the horizons, nobleman and their families could see the glow of fires and the cries of the savage mobs. Luckily, Ollie had escaped from the violence and chaos, traveling to Budapest in June with fellow African-American artist, Susie Taylor (born 1885 in NY), who had arrived in Europe sixteen months earlier with the "Georgia Pickaninnies". The women briefly traveled across the continent together before Susie decided to return home to America. That autumn, as Russia became isolated due to the sudden halt of telegraph and postal services, many other American expatriates began boarding trains and ships in the chaos back towards America, or at least other safer European countries.

On June 6, 1907, the 1905 Revolution was finally extinguished with brutal force. Although order was established, the issues that sparked the violence remained and fueled the peasants' desire for revenge. A tense atmosphere gripped the country. There was the constant presence of the strongly emerging left-wing movement which was bent on purging the decadence of Tsarist Russia. This was, of course, the infant Bolshevik movement, but despite this business was booming again. After the revolution, a small suffragette movement swelled across Russia. The emancipation of women brought a shift in Russian society, billowing Victorian gowns were thrown aside and replaced by fashionable unimpeding svelte dresses designed by designer Lamanova. Divorce laws were eased in response to feminine demands for freedom of choice in marriage. Throughout the summer, theaters and cabarets reopened, foreigners returned and entertainers resumed their tours through the major cities. Throughout the year, Black entertainers traveled to Russia in droves. With the exception of random artists touring Europe, very few black people have ever been to Russia, and very few of them have remained in it to live. All across the Russia, Black performers such as Belle Davis, Abbie Mitchell, Josephine Morcashani, the Black Troubadours, and the popular duo Johnson & Dean filled the musichalls with excitement every night. They treated each other cordially and invited each new fellow Negro performer into their hotel rooms for breakfasts consisting of neckbones and beans to feel more at home. In St. Petersburg, a confectioner exploited the popularity of Ragtime by issuing the latest Negro minstrel hits on records pressed into discs of hard baker's chocolate.

Days after the Revolution ended, Ollie returned to Russia and resumed touring along Russian theatrical circuits. On June 19, she was at St. Petersburg's Demidov Garden Amusement Park located on 35–39 Ofitserskiy Street (now 35–39 Decembrists Street), performing at the Farce Theatre. Established by businessman Alexander Demidov in 1864, the Amusement Park was a popular family-oriented attraction that offered pantomimes, fireworks, operettas and non-stop cabaret performances.

In 1909, Ollie adopted the French influenced pseudonym, La Olliette and paired up with African-American entertainer, Joseph "Happy Joe" Williams forming the Kreolen Duett (Creole Duet). Together the pair toured across Germany, appearing at Hamburg's Kabarett Holle (November 1–6). The following year, the pair were appearing in Odessa's famous North Hotel, which had a beautiful open-air café chantant in the back gardens. Odessa was a polyglot city and a cosmopolitan city, and theatrical life there was in full swing. Its population numbered 630 thousand people, a third of whom were Jews and 30 thousand of whom were foreigners – Greeks, Armenians, Germans, Romanians, Italians and many others. With its wide, straight, shady streets and elegant stone houses, it would not be out of place anywhere in the Mediterranean. The city was an important trading center and, despite its distance from two capitals, it was never a quiet or provincial city. Trendy restaurants and hotels, gourmet shops, popular cafes and several theaters enjoyed the attention of many wealthy citizens. Sailors from exotic ports mixed up with the city robbers in noisy taverns next to the commercial port. On the outskirts of the city, the coast of the estuaries was littered with villas, looking at the sparkling sea surface. During their Ukrainian engagement, Ollie spent the majority of her time corresponding with Minnie Brown, who was residing in Moscow. In June 1910, the duo were in Turkey performing in the mysterious Ottoman city of Constantinople before William returned to his residence in London in September.

In 1911, Ollie appeared in Riga at the Olympia Theater (February 3–14) and Reval's Metropol Theater (March 5).

=== Miss Olita (1912–1913) ===
Embarking upon a solo tour, by July 1912 she appearing in Hamburg with variety artist, George Mitchell, as seen on her passport that applied for on July 23 at the American Consulate.

Around this time, Ollie was introduced to Danish impresario, Jakob August Jensen. Born on February 14, 1885, in Copenhagen to Augusta Sofie Katrine Marie Johansen and Peter Jensen, Jakob grew up rather comfortably in the middle of the Danish capital near the famous Tivoli Gardens and Københavns Hovedbanegård (Copenhagen Central Train Station) at Dannebrogsgade 22 (1890) located in the grimy Meat Packing District and Vesterbrogade 38 (1900) located in the Indre By District. In 1907, Jakob was sentenced to 80 days at Vestre Faengsel Prison for giving gonorrhea to his unsuspecting girlfriend, Anne Marie Anderson Norregaard. A while later, in 1911, Jakob moved to the Netherlands to start a new life in Rotterdam. Not long after meeting, Jakob and Ollie returned to Copenhagen, where they promptly wed. With her new spouse also working as her manager, Ollie, now a solo artist, adopted the new pseudonym, Miss Olita (sometimes spelled Ollita). During the winter, Mr. & Mrs. Jensen returned to the Netherlands, settling in the bustling Dutch city of Amsterdam, where Ollie debuted onstage on November 17, at the Palace Cabaret.

=== World War I (1914–1918) ===
On June 28, 1914, Gavrilo Princip assassinated Archduke Franz Ferdinand of Austria in Sarajevo, setting in motion the events leading to the outbreak of World War I. In the aftermath of the assassination, the Austro-Hungarian Empire declared war on the Kingdom of Serbia at 11 a.m. on July 28. The Netherlands declared themselves neutral on July 30. According to international law, neutrality had to be declared in each instance of a war declaration between two sovereign nations. During August, the Dutch declaration of neutrality had to be repeated regularly. Foreign artists and musicians returned to their home country and numerous Dutch entertainers were called into arms. Across the Netherlands, the war was followed attentively. Newspapers reported extensively on the progress and consequences of the Great War. The Dutch government urged the press to observe a certain restraint: too much praise or too much criticism for one of the belligerent parties might endanger the fragile Dutch neutrality. However, not everyone observed the requested reserve. Some newspapers and journalists are proponents of one of the factions and others are easily bribed.

In 1915, from a military point of view, the neutral Netherlands remained out of reach, but the world conflict had an impact on daily life. The Netherlands was flooded by one million Belgian refugees, that faced boredom and searched for light entertainment. Longing to forget the tensions of time, entertainment life flourished. The cafes, dance halls and cinemas were full of rewards with that extra clientele. Soon, numerous African-American artists who found shelter in the tiny neutral country such as, Elmer Spyglass, Arabella Fields, Josephine Morcashani, Mamie & Holman and Miss Olita were performing around Dutch theatrical circuits.

In October 1916, Ollie participated in the two-week International Soubrette Contest at the Palace Concert Hall (October 1–15) alongside popular African-American concert singer, Arabella Fields, whom had fled from Germany with her husband/manager. The following month, she traveled to Amsterdam with a week's engagement at the Grand Gala Theater (November 1–4). On April 2, 1917, Ollie was in Rotterdam performing at the Metropole Theater. Several weeks later, she traveled to the far southeastern Dutch province of Gelderland that sat along the German border to perform the oldest city in Holland, Nijmegen, where she was thrilled audiences for a week at the Chicago Theater (April 22–27). In May, she returned to Rotterdam, appearing at the De Matador Cabaret alongside fellow Afro-American entertainers, Arabella Fields and Josephine Morcashani. On July 3, authorities in Amsterdam held back the potato supply until there was enough to feed the whole city. This led to a large riot and looting of stores and markets. Rioters broke into warehouses and took potatoes intended to be exported. Two thousand soldiers were called in to break up the riot but were repelled by the rioters. Another clash took place in the city of Kattenberg where three groups of workmen, one from the Stoomvaart Maatschappij Nederland, protested the lack of food for manual laborers. They also demanded that they receive actual food and not promissory papers. In September, she appeared for two weeks at the American Music-hall (September 16–30). In late 1918, Ollie appeared at Amsterdam's Grand Gala Theater (September 16–30) and Breda's Pergola Theater (October 25).

=== Post War Career (1919–1950) ===
In 1919, after the war ended, she spent time in Amsterdam, appearing at 'T Brouwhuis (November 1–7) and the popular Cabaret de la Monnaie (December 6).

On March 30, 1920, Ollie renewed her American passport after eight years to begin her first European tour since the outbreak of the war. Afterwards, Jakob decided to return home to Denmark, bringing Ollie with him. The couple moved in at 7 Rolsvej with Jakob's older sister, Margrethe Marie Johannes Jensen (born August 5, 1878). During the fall of 1920, she was touring Norway, performing at the Maxim Variete (August 7–28) and Hjorten (September 2 – October 13) before returning home to Denmark. Danish newspapers make no mention of Ollie performing in the country. She soon retired from the stage and was noted as a housewife in the 1921 Danish Census. In the spring of 1921, Ollie returned the United States after 18 years abroad and reunited with her sister Pearl. Shortly after returning home to Denmark, she divorced her husband and returned to the Netherlands in 1923 to resume her career as a performer.

Throughout the 1920s and 1930s, Ollie returned to being a popular fixture in Holland, Scandinavia and Germany. Moving away from dancing, she performed in cabarets and theaters as a major Afro-American singer. In 1930, after a final visit to the United States, her European engagements began to dwindle and she soon vanished from the limelight after the winter of 1934. By the late-30s, she was residing in The Hague's squalid Jewish Quarter, moving from one apartment to another. Records of Ollie disappear during World War II, possibly in hiding during the German occupation of the Netherlands. Life in the Reichskommissariat Niederlande would've been extremely difficult for a 60-year-old Afro-American unemployed woman living in the heart of the Jewish district.

Ollie Gertrude Fitch died on July 1, 1950, in The Hague at age 69 and was most likely buried in her adopted country.
