= Cassie Walmer =

British singer, dancer and comedian (1888–1980)

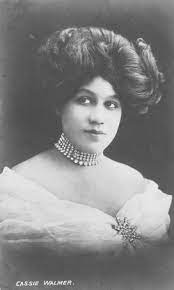
Cassie Walmer in around 1905

Cassandra (Cassie) Walmer (20 June 1888 – 11 October 1980) was a British singer, dancer and comedian who performed in music halls and variety theatres in Britain, Australia and New Zealand from the 1890s until 1947. After 1919 she appeared in a duo act with Frank O'Brian under the name of Janice Hart, co-creating several revues with him, including Birds of the Night. She made successful tours of Australia in 1906–07, 1913, 1928–1930 and 1935, two of which also included New Zealand. She also appeared on BBC Radio from 1944 until 1952.

Sean Mayes and Sarah Whitfield describe her as one of "three extraordinary Black women" active in the early 20th century, commenting that they "challenge preconceptions about what might be possible in the first decade of the twentieth century".

== Early life ==
Cassie Walmer was born on 20 June 1888 at William Street, in the Regent's Park area of Camden, London, the youngest child of Stephanie (née Schmidt), a woman of French or German origin, in her second marriage to George C. Walmer, an African-American actor and musician who was born in the United States. Cassie had seven older siblings and half-siblings.

Her father was known for portraying Uncle Tom in adaptations of Uncle Tom's Cabin, and Cassie joined him at the Theatre Royal, Leicester, as early as 1891. She was then aged three, and the event led to the family being investigated for breaching child labour legislation. She continued to appear as a child performer in music halls, even after her father's death in 1897, learning to sing, dance and perform in comedy acts.

== Solo career ==
Walmer made her professional debut at twelve, and was already established in England by the early years of the 20th century. In 1905, for example, she appeared in London, across England and in Scotland. Her initial act involved singing and dancing; she later also started to perform singing impressions.

She first toured Australia and New Zealand in 1906–7, accompanied by her mother, after being recruited by the British-born Australian impresario, Harry Rickards. Sean Mayes and Sarah Whitfield comment that this was despite the then-current White Australia policy. Her earliest Australian appearance was a slot at the Melbourne Opera House on 11 August 1906; a reviewer in Punch described her as a "very clever artist and mimic". She appeared at the Tivoli in Sydney that September for a three-month season; the whole tour extended over a year and also took in Newcastle and Brisbane in Australia, and Dunedin, Christchurch, Wellington and Auckland in New Zealand. She sang English music-hall numbers (such as "Don't Tell the World Your Troubles", "Come Down, Joanna Brown, Come Down" and later "Anna Maria"), as well as American traditional songs (such as "You Never Miss the Water Till the Well Runs Dry"). Her voice at this point was described as a well-trained "deep, rich contralto" and "sweetly powerful". She was billed as a "champion buck dancer" (a form of tap dancing) and was noted for her "remarkable sand-dance", during which she supported herself on one leg as a "veritable human spinning-top". In March 1907, Truth reported her accompanying the well-known American boxer, Jack Johnson, at a social event held by the Coloured Progressive Association. Her costumes also drew comment; she said in an interview in 1913 that she designed her dresses herself, and had them made specially in Paris at a cost of £20–30 each.

On 12 June 1911, Walmer married Joseph Edward Louisson, a bookmaker, in Lambeth, London; he accompanied her when she made her second Australian tour in February–June 1913 (promoted after Rickards' death by Hugh D. McIntosh), visiting Melbourne, Sydney and Adelaide. She continued to be advertised as "Miss Cassie Walmer". The tour was again very successful, with a reviewer for Truth commenting that she had "lost none of her old dash and vivacity, and simply took the house by storm with her stunts."

During the First World War, Walmer toured in music halls across Britain until 1919; according to her Oxford Dictionary of National Biography entry she was "extremely popular with audiences all over the country", and her reviews were invariably positive; the Daily Gazette, for example, in a review of a 1916 performance in Middlesbrough, describes her voice as "very fine" and her dancing as "very artistic". Louisson joined the Royal Army Service Corps; after the war, the couple separated permanently, but remained legally married until his death in 1947.

In her tours of Australia and New Zealand, she was sometimes billed as the "Dusky Princess", and praised for her renditions of "coon songs", such as "Moving Day" and "Pucker Up Your Lips, Miss Lindy" by the American writers, Harry and Albert von Tilzer. Her race was only occasionally alluded to in British reviews.

== Hart and O'Brian ==
After the First World War, she formed a duo with Frank O'Brian, a dancer and comedian, taking the stage name of "Janice Hart", which she used exclusively from the mid-1920s. The name intentionally evoked the popular French performer, Josephine Baker. According to Stephen Bourne in Walmer's entry in the Oxford Dictionary of National Biography, O'Brian was born John William Annison Robson in 1894, and came from Gateshead, County Durham, although some contemporary reports, including his death notice in The Stage, described him as Irish or Australian, and some modern sources follow suit. Hart and O'Brian are documented as performing together in Birkenhead in March 1919, and the duo appeared in variety theatres across Britain in the 1920s and 1930s.

In 1928–1930, they made an extensive tour of Australia and New Zealand. Despite her previous popularity in Australia, Hart was not connected with Walmer during this tour. They opened in Sydney and then Adelaide, went on to spend ten months in New Zealand, playing in Christchurch, Dunedin, Wellington and Auckland, and then went to Melbourne, Sydney and finally Brisbane. They were supported by the English comedian, Bert Lee, as well as many local dancers and a jazz band. Their show included a medley of songs, dances and comedy sketches; "revue items trod on each other's heels with riotous speed, and every piece was refreshing and spontaneous", according to a review in the Sydney Sun. Hart's "low, compelling voice" and "agile" dancing were praised, and her extravagant costumes, made in London and Paris, again drew comment.

In 1931, Hart and O'Brian created a revue show entitled Birds of the Night or Oiseaux de la Nuit, which a review of 1932 stated was based on Baker's Paris show. They returned to Australia in 1935, performing Birds of the Night, accompanied by a cast of sixty singers, dancers, acrobats and comedians. The show was advertised as being their version of a revue by Baker, with Hart taking Baker's role. Bourne comments that Hart advertised herself as Baker's successor, despite being substantially her senior. The duo played in Melbourne and Sydney, where Hart injured her ankle in an onstage fall. Hart and O'Brian were performing in Britain together in 1937, and they continued to tour in Britain during and shortly after the Second World War, creating new revues, Victory Vanities, Vive Paree! and Let's Go Gay (1946). The pair retired in 1947.

They also sometimes appeared separately; in 1934 Hart starred in Harlem Nightbirds at the Queen's Theatre in Poplar, east London. She sporadically featured in Palace of Varieties, a BBC Radio show, in 1944–1951. Her last documented appearance was on BBC radio in 1952.

== Later life ==
She and O'Brian married on 11 April 1949 in Paddington, London, after the death of her first husband. O'Brian died in 1979. Cassie Walmer died on 11 October 1980 in Camden, London.

== Modern reception ==
Sean Mayes and Sarah Whitfield describe Cassie Walmer as one of "three extraordinary Black women" active in the early 20th century, comparing her with Belle Davis and Josephine Morcashani. They comment that all three "challenge preconceptions about what might be possible in the first decade of the twentieth century", and present a possible reading of them as "actively consuming the white consumption of Black performance." The historian Stephen Bourne also researched Walmer in the context of the contributions of Black entertainers to British history. Bill Egan researched Walmer/Hart's work in Australia and New Zealand in detail for a 2019 book on performers of African American heritage, in particular refuting a claim that Hart's material was based on Josephine Baker's show.

== Further reading and external links ==
- Stephen Bourne. Black Poppies: Britain's Black Community and the Great War (2nd edn) (The History Press; 2019) ISBN 978-0-7509-9082-0
- Recording of Cassie Walmer singing "Come down, Joanna Brown, come down!" (1907) – Cylinder Audio Archive, University of California, Santa Barbara
