= Pearl Hobson =

American-born Russian actress

- Born: Pearl Lillian Hobson; 7 July 1879; Lisbon, Virginia, U.S.
- Died: 4 June 1919 (aged 39); Metsäkylä, Finland
- Occupations: Dancer; singer; actress
- Years active: 1902–1919

Pearl Hobson (Russian: Перла Гобсон, 7 July 1879 in Bedford County — 4 June 1919 in Metsäkylä) was an American-born Russian actress, singer, dancer and cabaret artist.

== Early life ==
Pearl Lillian Hobson was born on July 7, 1879, in Bedford County to Susan Hobson and an unknown (possibly white) father. Eventually the Hobson family relocated to Roanoke.

In 1898, at age 19 (or 15), Pearl had migrated north to New York, where she frequently posted ads in various New York newspapers seeking employment as a live-in housekeeper. By 1900, she found as a maid for the Leventritt family.

== Career ==
=== Florida Creole Girls (1902–1903) ===
During the summer of 1901, French actress, Nina Diva, wife of the Austrian millionaire Baron Erlanger organized the Fencing Musketeers (also known as the Fencing Octoroons and Les Mousquetaires Noirs) consisting of eleven black women, which after two months of rehearsing, opened at New York's Circle Theater (October 26, 1901). The show consisted of lead performer, Jennie Scheper (born 1877 in Washington DC), who had come from the Sons of Ham show. There was also, Bidie Hall (born 1882 in Dunkirk, NY), Edith Adams (born 1876 in Indianapolis), Ollie Fitch (born 1880 in Staunton, VA), Mattie Stafford (born 1870 in Norfolk, VA), Minnie Brown (born 1884 in Chicago, Il), William H. Ward (born 1876 in Salisbury, MO), Jennie Ward and of course, Pearl as well as two other unnamed women. In January 1902, the show played Boston's Howard Theater (January 12–18) and New York's Garden Terrace.

On February 5, 1902, the troupe departed from Philadelphia aboard the SS Belgenland, arriving 4–5 days later in Liverpool. By the time the show reached Europe, the show had lost member, now advertised as the 10 Fencing Musketeers Company. Early February through March, the toured across Germany, appearing in Bremen, Kiel and Hamburg. On April 14, while appearing in Copenhagen's Arenatheatret, the women applied for passports at the US Embassy. Later the women appeared in Stockholm's Svea-Teatern (May 1–5) and Budapest (June–July). On July 5, while appearing in the Hungarian capital, the furious women attacked their manager for not paying as a much as they were promised. The fighting became so severe that Hungarian police had to intervene.

Afterwards, the women reappeared that October in London, now managed by Geraldine de Grant, a German impresario who renamed them, Die 7 Florida Creols Girls sending them off to continue touring across the continent. The troupe later moved on to Düsseldorf's Apollotheater, Leipzig's Kristallpalast, Brussels, Amsterdam's Rembrandt Theater (November 24-December 9) and Rotterdam's Casino Variete.

In January 1903, the troupe opened in Paris at the Casino de Paris (January 1-February 23), where they were praised for their extraordinary demonstration of the Cakewalk. So popular were the women, that they were photographed at Studio Waléry, who distributed their photos as postcards for eager European and American tourists. During their sojourn in the French capital, the troupe quickly began to dissolve. Mattie Stafford quickly became a popular French attraction, Bidie Hall began her solo tour and Edith Hall probably returned to America. The remaining quartette, continued on with a month's engagement at Vienna's Ronacher Theater (March 7–31) and two weeks at Budapest's Municipal Orpheum Theater (Apr.1-15). In June, the troupe finally reached the vast expanses of Imperial Russia, appearing at a popular café-chantant in Moscow. Unfortunately, in Russia, every theater was under the power of the police. Nothing could be said or done against their wishes, and if the wish to stop any performance, why they stopped it, and that was all that there was to it. The police saw their first performance and allowed them to go on. However, after their tenth performance, the police stopped them, saying that the American cake-walk was too suggestive. On July 4, the American Consul, Samuel Smith, invited all the American performers who were in Moscow to a celebration on the grounds of the consulate. The program included, the Manhattan Quartette, Smith & Doretto, Weston of loop the Hoopology, Miss Walcott, the Florida Creole Girls Quartette and Harry Houdini (who wrote about the women in his diary).

Afterwards the troupe moved on to appear in St. Petersburg and Riga's Hagenstalna Wafaras Teatris (August 18–23). In October, the troupe were in London, appearing at the Royal Holborn Theatre before finally completely dissolving. Minnie Brown returned to Germany and Jennie Scheper adopted the pseudonym, Madagascar Girl and departed for her own solo tour.

=== Early Solo Career (1904–1906) ===
At the beginning of 1904, as the Russo-Japanese War raged, Pearl and Ollie Fitch returned to St. Petersburg to pursue their solo careers. On February 18, Pearl opened successfully at Helsinki's Nymark & Stavenow Restaurant (February 18-March 19). On April 15, she returned to St. Petersburg and applied for a new passport at the American Embassy. Immediately afterwards, she began traversing across the Russian Empire as a popular American variety artist around musichalls between St. Petersburg, Odessa and Moscow. On January 22, 1905, a large public demonstration outside of the Tsar's palace escalated into the Bloody Sunday riots. Chaos quickly ensued across the Imperial capital and soon across the Russian Empire. Throughout 1905, serfs and radicals took to the streets and engaged in armed struggle with soldiers and the gendarmerie, sailors of the Potemkin battleship mutinied at the Black Sea port of Odessa. Tsar Nikolai badly misjudged the Russo-Japanese War in the Far East, which soon lost public support and exposed the many weaknesses of the Russian military and political institutions. Defeat at the hands of 'inferior' Asians served to speed up public unrest that was becoming so serious that the Tsar was forced to end the war with the Treaty of Portsmouth on September 5, 1905. To overcome the heartbreak due to the loss of the war, St. Petersburg was overcome with forced gaiety, which Pearl joined in.

During the spring of 1906, Pearl was entertaining in Moscow as noted by her visit to the American Consulate on April 28. That summer, despite increasing violence across Russia, Pearl was in the seaside Ukrainian city of Odessa entertaining audiences at the popular famous North Hotel-Restaurant, which had a beautiful open-air café chantant in the back gardens. Odessa was a polyglot city and a cosmopolitan city, and theatrical life there was in full swing. Its population numbered 630 thousand people, a third of whom were Jews and 30 thousand of whom were foreigners - Greeks, Armenians, Germans, Romanians, Italians and many others. With its wide, straight, shady streets and elegant stone houses, it would not be out of place anywhere in the Mediterranean. The city was an important trading center and, despite its distance from two capitals, it was never a quiet or provincial city. Trendy restaurants and hotels, gourmet shops, popular cafes and several theaters enjoyed the attention of many wealthy citizens. Around September 1906, Pearl sailed to New York to wait until the violence of the revolution died down. She eventually decided to visit her relatives, spending ten months in Bluefield with her brother Pompey, a brakeman with the Pocahontas division. She also made trips to visit her other brothers, Claude in Columbus and Romeo in Roanoke. Pearl attracted considerable attention in West Virginia for owning many valuable gems and wearing a $1,500 fur coat. While in Bluefield, she also took the liberty of taking out an $800 life insurance policy with the Metropolitan Life Insurance Company.

=== Russia's Mulatto Sharpshooter (1907–1913) ===
On August 8, 1907, Pearl went to New York and immediately applied for a new passport before traveling to Europe. Arriving in Russia on September 17, Pearl established herself in St. Petersburg and by the winter had established a considerable following in Moscow during her successful engagement at the prestigious Yar restaurant. Located on the northwestern edge of Moscow, the Yar Restaurant, opened in the 19th Century, was among Moscow's most celebrated restaurants and stood out because due to its age. The Yar was considered by many connoisseurs to be the finest in Russia and of the best in all of Europe. Whenever she wasn't performing, Pearl watched from the wings as the popular Sokolovsky Gypsy choir performed beautiful Russian romance songs led by the gypsy guitarist Nikolai Shishkin. The Yar's artistic director was Afro-American, Frederick Bruce Thomas, a former waiter whom immigrated to Russia in 1899 and had worked at the popular Aumont Theater since then. He too had fled Russia during the terrible 1905 revolution and upon his return had gained a position at the Yar. It was he, who had possibly arranged Pearl's engagement at the restaurant, and was soon even managing her career. Pearl became a well loved, wealthy and respected entertainer, performing in Russian, German and French, attending films, symphonies, operas and making conquests in high society. Thousands flocked to the theaters to hear this Virginia coloured girl perform, and soon the Rubles poured in.

In 1909, Pearl returned south, to her old stomping grounds at Odessa's North Hotel-Reataurant, where posters plastered everywhere proclaimed her as Russia's Mulatto Sharpshooter.

By the beginning of 1910, Pearl was residing in a luxurious apartment at 20 Kamennoostrovsky Prospect, which was upkept by a team of servants. Several doors down from the new Hobson residence, at 10-12 Kamennoostrovsky, was the popular Aquarium Theatre. In between the nonstop masquerade balls, fireworks and festivals, Pearl sang beautiful Russian Romances and performed her dramatically orchestrated dances nightly at the most fashionable venue in the capital of the Russian Empire. During this successful period, Pearl soon caught the eye of the illustrious Count Alexander Sheremetev. Born in St. Petersburg in 1859, Sheremetev attended the Corps des Pages before joining a guard regiment and being later named aide-de-camp to Tsar Nikolai II in 1902. Like his grandfather, Sheremetev had a passionate love of music. In the 1880s, he established his own symphony orchestra, which gave free concerts in St. Petersburg. He was himself a fine pianist and head of the Imperial Court Choir (since 1901) where he worked alongside composer, Mily Balakirev. His other love was firefighting. He even established at his Ulyanka estate the Peter the Great Firefighting Brigade, which was composed of six hundred strong men outfitted with the latest firefighting technology. Tsar Nikolai II granted him special permission to quit receptions at the court whenever there was a fire, so he could ride off with his brigade to battle the flames. From his father, Aleksandr inherited more than five hundred thousand acres in thirteen provinces, one fashionable mansion on the French embankment in St. Petersburg and ten homes in Moscow (including the extraordinary palatial estate of Ostankino) where he lived grandly with his wife, Countess Maria Geiden, and their four children. He never traveled without a large entourage of servants, personal musicians and even cows from his villages to assure a steady supply of fresh milk. Surprisingly Countess Maria wasn't angered by her husband's relationship with a negress, and in fact considered Pearl a friend. It wasn't unusual for the Countess to occupy a private box on one side of the theatre while Pearl occupied one on the other side. In Moscow, Sheremetev kept up another mistress, Dagmara Karozus, a dancer at the Moscow Arts Theatre and shared an apartment on 3, Sheremetevsky Lane with several other Russian dancers, such as Elizaveta Otten. With the help of Sheremetev, Pearl developed into a well-received singer and ballet dancer, that headlined nightly at the Aquarium Theatre.

During the summer of 1911, while engaged once again at Odessa's North Hotel, she applied for a new passport on August 5. The following year, Pearl was in Kiev, performing for a week at the Apollo Theater (March 7–14).

=== The Great War & Revolutions (1914–1917) ===
In January 1915, in the middle of a very cold winter, the attention of Russians was riveted to another terrible wave, reports of war in Galicia. Austro-Hungarian troops launched a counter-offensive against the Russian forces in the Carpathians. But this attack was a fiasco, and by March the advancing Russians had taken the great fortress of Przemysl, thus preparing for the march along the pass to Budapest and Vienna - the two capitals of the Habsburg monarchy. Dramatic events unfolded in the south and the Russian populace watched them, experiencing a mixture of anxiety and arousal. At this time, Russia opened a second front - in the Caucasus Mountains and the Black Sea. The Ottoman Empire was its longtime enemy, which is now united with the Central Powers. Two months after the start of the war, Turkish warships shelled cities on the southern coast of Russia, including Odessa.

After the February Revolution, on March 28, Pearl registered with the American Embassy instead of bothering to renew her passport like Georgette Harvey, Minnie Brown or any other American citizen planning to flee the country. The Provisional Government declared broad civil liberties, it also pardoned all political prisoners, including terrorists; in addition, about two thousand thieves and murderers were released from prisons. Russia was flooded with a wave of crime - there were looting in the streets, attacks on houses and businesses. The new militia, which consisted mainly of volunteer students, was ineffective, and homeowners were forced to organize their own associations for mutual protection.

Throughout the course of the October Revolution, with her artistic career suddenly interrupted, Pearl spent her time with her servants packing up her silverware, linens, furnishings, expensive fur coats, jewelry, stage costumes and musical instruments valued at about two hundred thousand Rubles.

Early December, after everything was loaded up, Pearl left Petrograd, traveling west along the Primorsky Highway into the Sestroretsky District. This narrow strip of coastal land was occupied by forests, parks and swamps with a much favorable climate compared to the Russian capital, and its beautiful beaches along the Gulf of Finland made it a popular resort destination for Russian nobility, who constructed numerous country villas throughout the area. She possibly arrived in the village of Tyurisevya (now Ushkovo), whose railway station had opened on November 1, 1916, otherwise, she would've had to stop in the town of Terijoki. It was in this village, a little area known as Harjula stood a small mountain surrounded by deep ravines and covered in ferns and arbors decorated with hazel and blue flowers. Numerous narrow walking paths led up the mountain to several observation platforms and a beautiful country mansion that had been purchased the previous year by Count Sheremetev. It was already teeming with servants, preparing for the arrival of the Count and his wife. It was from here, Pearl continued along the Primorsky Highway towards the coastal village of Metsäkylä (now Molodyozhnoye), a small Finnish village first established in 1721. In the southern part of the village, in tiny Merila district sat a quaint two-story cottage with a four-story tower attached, which became known as, Dacha Hobson. The property, surrounded by acres of trees with a remarkable view of the Gulf of Finland and the mouth of the Vammelsuu River, was Sheremetev's gift to his mulatto mistress. As she settled into her new home, she sent to America her last letter to her family, mentioning that she had survived the Revolutions and had recently purchased a new house. On December 6, Finland declared independence from Russia, immediately closing off its borders and completely absorbing the entire Sestroretsky District into the new nation. With Metsäkylä now a part of Finland, Pearl was safe from Russia's chaos.

=== Finland (1918–1919) ===
On January 27, 1918, Finland entered into a hectic civil war, as the former Grand Duchy of the Russian Empire transformed into an independent state. The civil war was fought between the Reds, led by a section of the Social Democratic Party, and the Whites, conducted by the conservative-based Senate and the German Imperial Army. The paramilitary Red Guards, composed of industrial and agrarian workers, controlled the cities and industrial centres of southern Finland. The paramilitary White Guards, composed of farmers, along with middle-class and upper-class social strata, controlled rural central and northern Finland. The conflict finally ended on May 15, as Finland emerged as an independent, democratic republic.

In December 1918, Pearl adopted four children: Anselm (1904), Aina (1905), Vanya (1909) and Elina (1913). Their mother, Anna Maria Repatti, had lost her husband in 1914 from smallpox and was now struggling to feed all of her children. Pearl offered to adopt of the children and moved them into her home. Unfortunately, six months later, Pearl Lillian Hobson died on June 4, 1919, at age 39 due to typhus, although Elina Repatti believes that Pearl instead died of the Spanish flu.
