= Josephine Morcashani =

Black British singer and entertainer

Josephine Morcashani (28 January 1870 – 1929) was a British entertainer and singer. Famous for her baritone voice and her play with gender expression, she was touring Europe and the world between 1898 and the 1920s. She was one of the few non-American Black entertainers touring Central Europe before World War I.

== Life and career ==
She was born in 1870 in London as Josephine Laura Fanny Stear as the daughter of a cab driver and his wife. In 1891, she married the Black American comedian and vocalist Joseph Henry Highsmith, who most likely influenced her to get active in the entertainment industry herself. In 1894, she gave birth to a son.

By 1898 she was working in Berlin under the stage name “Morcashani”, she was also known as "La Belle Creole". She performed at least eight times at Wintergarten Berlin and at several other venues. In 1908, her permanent address was in Gneisenaustraße 20 in Berlin. She had performances in various European cities such as, among others, Stockholm, Copenhagen, Danzig, Antwerp, Amsterdam, Bochum, Vienna, Budapest, St. Petersburg, Lisbon and Ghent, but was also performing outside of Europe, for example in Cape Town as well as a performance in the US in 1904 and a tour of Latin America in 1909. In St. Petersburg, she met with Belle Davis in 1907. Between 1908 and 1911, sound films were produced with her as a subject that were mentioned in German newspapers and produced by Deutsche Bioscop.

She was in Berlin during the outbreak of World War I in 1914 and shortly after she managed to get a US passport, as her marriage certificate showed that her husband was American. During most of the war and after, between 1915 and 1921, she was working in the Netherlands, which stayed neutral during World War I, often performing together with Arabella Fields. Her 25th anniversary of her performance career was marked with a headline performance in Rotterdam in 1921.

She was then performing again in Vienna in the 1920s alongside Abbie Mitchell and Harry Malcolm Wellmon. She died in 1929.

== Performance style ==
Her name and her claimed origins changed several times, sometimes by her own hand and other times at the hand of reviewers. For example, in several advertisements that she placed herself in newspapers, she labeled herself with her stage name and the addition “La Belle Creole” referring to mixed race European and African peoples born in the West Indies. In May 1898 in Leipzig, she was billed as an Australian singer, and reviewed as "the favourite singer and dancer of the black prince Menelik [emperor of Ethiopia]" with "curly Negro hair and a yellow complexion.”

She used singing as a way of playing with gender expression. She was a baritone singer. Sometimes she dressed in full feminine costume, and in some instances dressed in masculine dress. She sang in German and English.

She performed one serious song and then two comedic songs during her performances. According to German male audiences at the time, it was reported they were both delighted and confused at the lust they felt when watching her perform her gender bending pieces.
