= Baroud =

1932 film

- Directed by: Rex Ingram; Alice Terry
- Written by: Rex Ingram; Peter Spencer; Benno Vigny; André Jaeger-Schmidt
- Produced by: Rex Ingram; Mansfield Markham; André Weill
- Starring: Felipe Montes; Rosita Garcia; Pierre Batcheff
- Cinematography: Sepp Allgeier; Léonce-Henri Burel; Marcel Lucien; Paul Portier
- Edited by: Lothar Wolff
- Music by: Jack Beaver; Louis Levy
- Production companies: Gaumont British Picture Corporation; Armor Films
- Distributed by: Ideal Films (UK); Gaumont (France)
- Release date: 18 November 1932
- Running time: 79 minutes
- Countries: France; United Kingdom
- Languages: French; English

Baroud is a 1932 British-French adventure film directed by Rex Ingram and Alice Terry and starring Felipe Montes, Rosita Garcia, and Pierre Batcheff. Actor Paul Henreid debuted in a small role. The film was released in separate French and English-language versions, the latter sometimes known by the title Love in Morocco.

It was the final film of Ingram, a leading Hollywood director of the silent era, and the last film appearance by Alice Terry, a leading Hollywood star of the silent era and Ingram's wife. The title is the Berber word for war.

== Plot ==
It is set in French Morocco. Two soldiers in the Spahis, one a Frenchman and the other the son of a chief allied to the French, are friends, but quarrel when the Frenchman becomes romantically involved with the other's sister. They join forces again to repulse an attack by a hostile tribe.

== Cast ==
=== English version ===
- Felipe Montes as Si Alal, Caid de Ilued
- Rosita Garcia as Zinah, his daughter
- Pierre Batcheff as Si Hamed
- Rex Ingram as André Duval
- Arabella Fields as Mabrouka, a slave
- Andrews Engelmann as Si Amarok
- Dennis Hoey as Captain Sabry
- Laura Salerni as Arlette
- Frédéric Mariotti
- Alice Terry
- Paul Henreid (film debut in a bit part)

=== French version ===
- Philippe Moretti as Si Allal, Caïd d'IIllouet
- Rosita Garcia as Zinah, la fille de Si Allal
- Pierre Batcheff as Si Hamed, le fils de Si Allal, Maréchal des Logis de Spahis
- Roland Caillaux as André Duval, Sergent de Spahis
- Arabella Fields as Mabrouka
- Andrews Engelmann as Si Amarock, Chef de tribu rebelle
- Georges Busby as Lakhdar
- Richard Gaillard as Capitaine Labry
- Colette Darfeuil as Arlette

== Bibliography ==
- Cook, Pam. Gainsborough Pictures. Cassell, 1997.
