= Molodyozhnoye, Saint Petersburg =

Municipal settlement in St. Petersburg, Russia

Coordinates: 60.2°N 29.52°E

Molodyozhnoye (Russian: Молодёжное; Finnish: Metsäkylä) is a municipal settlement in Kurortny District of the federal city of St. Petersburg, Russia, located on the Karelian Isthmus, on the northern shore of the Gulf of Finland. Population: 1,587 (2010 census) 1,437 (2002 census).

Until the end of the Winter War in 1940, it was a part of Finland.

== Notable people ==
- Pearl Hobson (1879–1919), an American-born Russian actress, singer, dancer and cabaret artist
