= Ushkovo =

Ushkovo (Russian: Ушково) may refer to:

- Ushkovo, Saint Petersburg, a municipal settlement under jurisdiction of the city of St. Petersburg, Russia
- Ushkovo, Republic of Karelia, a village in the Republic of Karelia, Russia
