= Arabella Fields =

American singer

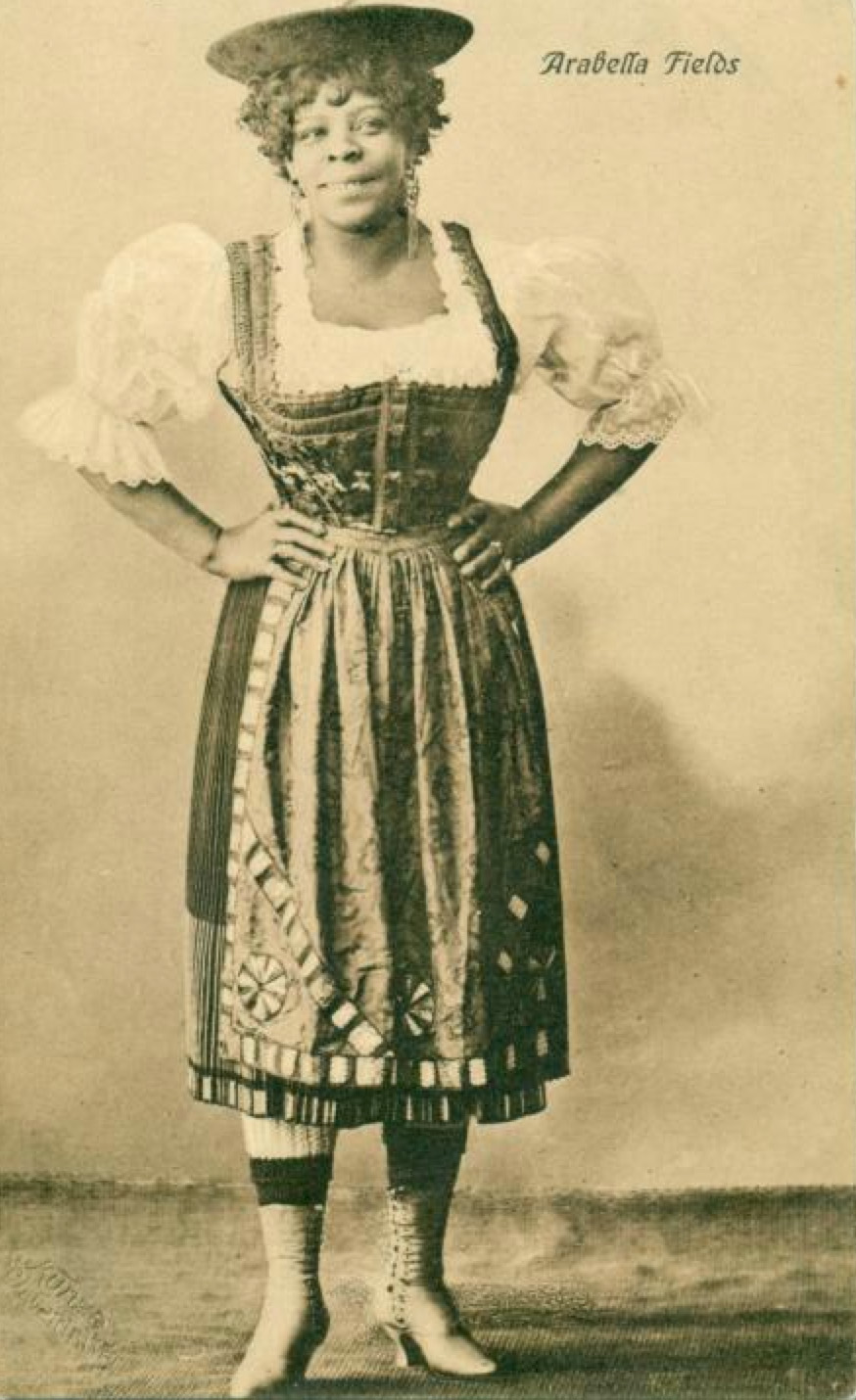
- Fields around 1910 in a German folk outfit

Background information
- Born: Sarah Arabella Middleton; 31 January 1879; Philadelphia, Pennsylvania, U.S.
- Died: 1930s
- Genres: Spirituals, German folk music, Lieder, traditional pop
- Occupations: Vedette, singer, dancer, actress
- Instrument: Vocals
- Years active: 1894–1933
- Label: Anker Phonogramm Rekords

Arabella Fields (née Sarah Arabella Middleton, also known as "Belle Fields, the Black Nightingale"; 31 January 1879 – after 1933) was an African-American singer. She moved to Europe in 1894 and is thought to be among the first black-American artists to record in Europe, making recordings of songs by Stephen Foster. She spoke five languages and was successful with European audiences singing lieder and yodeling.

== Early life ==
Sarah Arabella Middleton was born in Philadelphia, Pennsylvania on January 31, 1879. Although details of her early life are unknown, she claimed to have begun performing in 1887 at the age of 8.

== Career ==
=== Early career (1894–1902) ===
In the summer of 1894, 15-year-old Arabella Middleton joined a vaudeville troupe organized by R.A. Cunningham heading for Europe. The 'San Francisco Minstrels', composed of four women and four men, opened in Berlin at the Charlotteburg Flora cabaret on August 30, 1894.

After a three-month German tour, the troupe traveled across Denmark, Norway, Sweden and Finland before arriving in the Russian Empire in late 1895 to embark on a Siberian tour. During this tour, she married fellow troupe member, James C. Fields. After the troupe fell apart during mid-1897, the couple formed the "James and Bella" duo, touring across Russia and Austria-Hungary. From 1900 to 1901, the couple toured Netherlands, United Kingdom and France as the 'American Jubilee Troubadours'. During her time with this troupe, Dutch newspapers began advertising Fields as the "Black Nightingale". In July 1902, after the troupe disbanded, James and Bella traveled to Berlin where Fields promptly left her husband and began working in theaters and cabarets around the German Reich.

=== Black Nightingale (1903–1913) ===
In 1904, Fields appeared in various German establishments, primarily in Berlin and Hamburg, performing arias and lieder. During this time, she met and married German Impresario and pianist, Engelhardt Albert Georg Winter (1878–1947). Winter originated from Bremen, where the couple established a residence. Winter deeply loved Fields, and the marriage produced a child, however Fields reportedly treated the marriage as one of convenience to further her career.

In mid-1905, her new impresario/husband organized her next concert. During the next 29-months, Fields performed around Holland, Germany and northern Austria. During the tour, Fields introduced to European audiences, besides her American dances, her ability to sing traditional Lieder songs in fluent German, English, Russian, French and Dutch. The tour concluded successfully in December 1907, when Arabella travelled to Berlin to record five songs with Anker Phonogramm Records at a studio on the Ritterstrasse. Around this same time, she also appeared in three short films (now lost): The Whistling Bowery Boy, Hello, My Baby! and The Song that reached my Heart.

In April 1908, she began another three-year tour, which opened in Italy. Over the next 34 months, Fields appeared in Germany, Denmark, Hungary, Austria, Sicily, Romania, Switzerland and possibly Russia. Throughout the course of this tour, her recordings were distributed and her films shown at local cinemas."City-Biograf" [Aalborg Amtstidende] (in Danish). Denmark. 1909. European critics spoke extremely well of Fields' performances. The height of this tour was in late 1910, during her appearance at Vienna's popular Gartenbau Theater where she performed "Nach Zigeuner Art", written especially for her by the famous Austrian composer and musical director, Theodor Wottitz. After a few months at home in Hamburg (February–April), Fields resumed touring again for another 33 months, beginning May 1911 in Leipzig. This tour took her once again across the European continent and a new exotic destination, Turkey.

=== WWI and Weimar Germany (1914–1924) ===
In February 1914, Fields returned home to Hamburg, where she remained for the next 16 months as performing in local establishments such as the Eden Theater and the Rathaus Cafe. In September 1915, the Winter household relocated to Amsterdam, where they remained for the next four years. Fields toured the Dutch provinces non-stop during this period, gaining a huge popularity there. In December 1915, Dutch composer Armand Haagman wrote for her the song, "My Indian Boy". She also frequently crossed back into Germany to appear in the spa town of Wiesbaden at the Vergnügungspalast until January 1916. The Winter household returned home to Germany, late April 1920. By 1921, her marriage with Winter had become extremely strained and the couple separated. Also the numerous street revolts and inflation made it difficult for Fields to continue working in Germany and that winter she left for a two/three-year Eastern European tour, spanning across Austria, Hungary, Czechoslovakia and Yugoslavia until 1924.

=== Sam Wooding and Louis Douglas (1925–1931) ===
In September 1925, while touring Sweden, Fields was hired by bandleader Sam Wooding to join his Chocolate Kiddies revue. The famous revue performed the latest Jazz numbers and introduced the Charleston across Germany, Denmark, Czechoslovakia, France, Spain and the Soviet Union before dissolving June 1926. Back in Berlin, Fields was hired by dancer Louis Douglas to be a part of his 'Black Follies' revue which toured the European continent until it fell apart in Poland sometime in April 1928. In early 1929, while Fields quietly toured the Netherlands for five months, Douglas hired her for his 'Louisiana' revue. Not only did the show obtain huge success in Europe, but also in Egypt and Syria. After nearly 25 months of touring, in August 1931, Fields quit the revue to film Rex Ingram's Baroud on location in Nice and Marrakesh. Fields starred in both the English and French versions of the film.
