= Belle Davis =

American choreographer, dancer and singer (1874–1938)

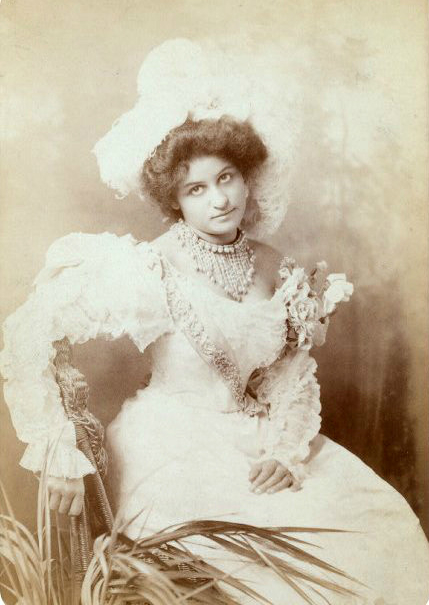
- Belle Davis
- Born: April 28, 1874; Chicago or New Orleans, United States
- Died: in or after 1938
- Occupations: Choreographer, dancer and singer
- Spouse: Eddie Whaley

Belle Davis (April 28, 1874 – in or after 1938) was an American choreographer, dancer and singer who became famous in the United Kingdom prior to World War I. She was in a group called the "Octoroons" in America and moved to Great Britain in 1902, where she toured accompanied by young African-American boys. She has been said to be the first black woman to make a recording.

== Life ==
Davis was born in 1874, likely in New Orleans (although some note her being a Chicagoan). In 1891, she joined the new burlesque "Creole Show" at Sam T. Jack's Opera House, and toured on Jack's circuit.

She was among the first wave of black American performers to capture the attention of European audiences. She went to Britain in 1897 with the revue "Oriental America". Davis also performed in the US, in places including Philadelphia at the Park Theatre on Broad Street and Keith's on Chestnut Street.

Having been booked on a tour of Britain's music hall theaters, Davis was on board the SS St. Paul that sailed from New York Harbor on June 5, 1901, bound for Southampton, England. From 1901 until World War I, she toured Europe and many other places around the world. She performed at several East End of London theatres and music halls, including the Hackney Empire, Stratford East, East Ham Place, and the Mile End Paragon. She was in a group called the "Octoroons" in America before she moved to Britain in 1901. She was said to be licensed by the US government to bring child performers to Britain. Some were known to exploit orphans in this way, but Davis was noted for her role as their guardian.

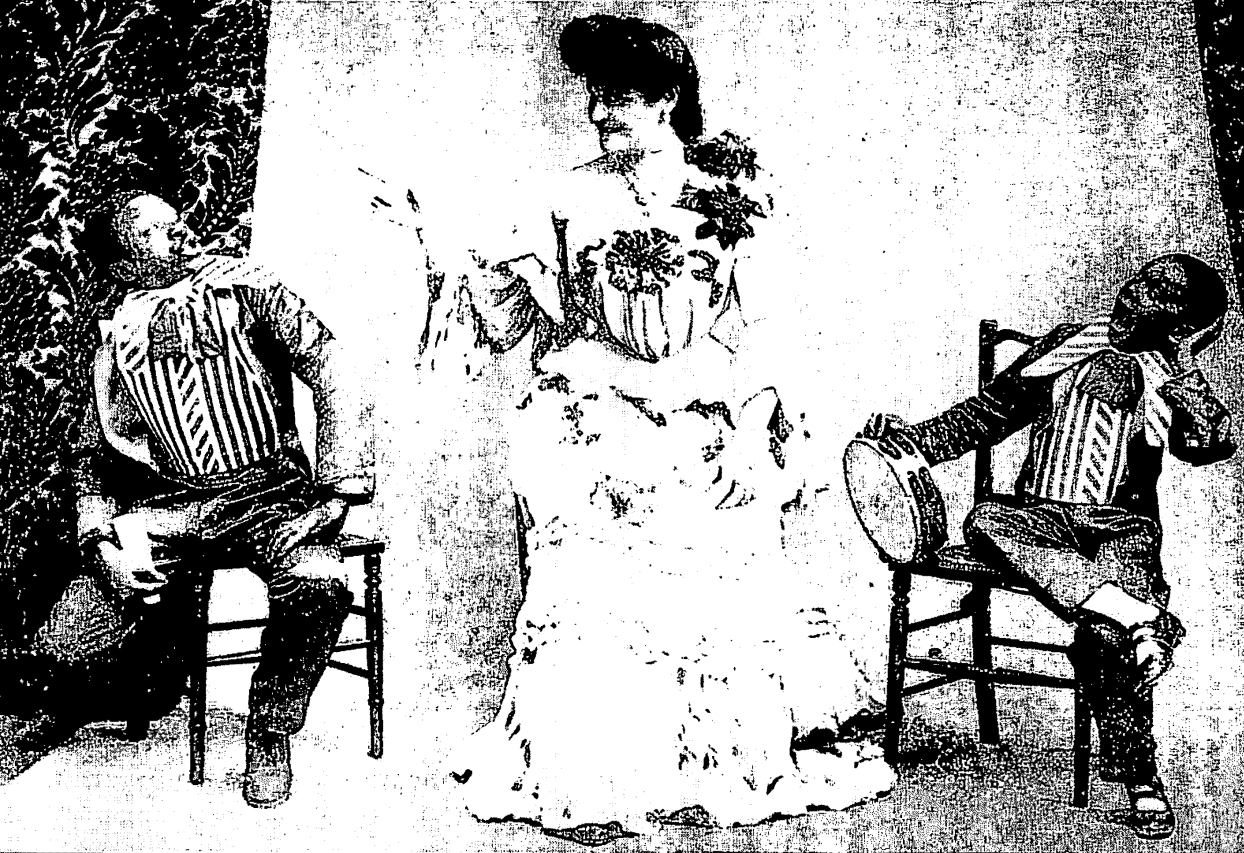
Belle Davis and "her pickchicks"

Davis was appearing at venues on the Empire Theatre circuit later that year. She was a soprano and her singing was of melodies and her appearance was stately and she had handsome promotional pictures. She was light-skinned and she was encourage to darken her skin so that she would fit the stereotype of a black entertainer. She appeared with two, sometimes four, African American boys who would add dances and comedy to her songs. Two of the boys, both then under ten years old, Irving "Sneeze" Williams and Sonny Jones went on to have their own careers as musicians. Through the years, other black boys joined her troupe, including Walter Humphrey, Louis Douglas, and Archie Ware, some of which went on to become stars themselves.

Davis was known by peers as the "Queen of ragtime singers". On 24 January 1902 she made a recording of "The Honeysuckle and the Bee" under the name of "Belle Davis and her Piccaninnies". They were back the following month to record "The Rainbow Coon". This is the first known recording by a Black woman. Davis would tour with this act visiting many of the major cities in England. Davis also recorded “Just Because She Made Them Goo-Goo Eyes” and “He Ain’t No Relation O’Mine,” and some are available to listen today as recordings or sheet music. She and her troupe also performed in silent movies at least twice in the early years of the 19th century, with at least one being filmed in Germany. In June 1904, Davis married singer and actor Troy Floyd, and at some point later, she married music hall and radio comedian Eddie Whaley.

The common style of performance that engaged audiences best were exaggerated mockeries of black stereotypes and caricatures, which were manifested by Black performers in different ways. Davis was applauded by audiences for performing popular songs by imitating a white singer who mimicked Black stereotypes. In the early 19th century, European audiences projected racist, over-sexualized imaginings of Black people onto performers, and some entertainers used this to their advantage. From 1899 up until the start of World War II, hundreds of African-American artists were able to find full-time work in Europe that was not available to black Americans in the US. Black performers also discovered less refined limits that the racist rules of American theater and film had put on them. While this was an advantage of living in Europe, many Europeans had a warped perception of black performers, viewing them through a lens of an uncivilized African spirit that had been reinterpreted through the lens of American modernism. The language used at the time in regard to Davis' troupe, song titles, and performance style exposes white audiences' desire to engage with racist caricatures for entertainment. Some of these performances are critiqued as degrading and undermining, with performers only looking to cater to white audiences.

In 1925, she was the choreographer at the "Casino de Paris" Music Hall. Here she recruited performers and arranged the dancing until 1929. During this time she returned to London to her house in Holborn, where she recruited five dancers including the tap dancer Josie Woods. They were called the "Magnolia Blossoms" and they were taken back to Paris. The latest time at which Davis is recorded in Europe was in Paris in 1929.

Davis left Europe and returned to America in 1938.

== Sources ==
- Peterson, Bernard L. Jr. (1993-10-25). A Century of Musicals in Black and White: An Encyclopedia of Musical Stage Works By, About, or Involving African Americans. ABC-CLIO. ISBN 978-0-313-06454-8.
