= Bradford Gilbert =

American architect (1853–1911)

Bradford Lee Gilbert
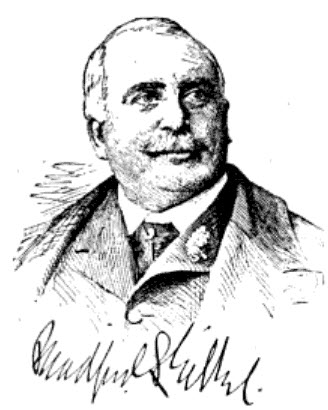
- Born: March 24, 1853; Watertown, New York, US
- Died: September 1, 1911 (aged 58); Accord, New York, U.S.
- Occupation: Architect
- Spouse(s): Cora Rathbone; Maria Fahy McAuley
- Awards: World's Columbian Exhibition – Gold Medal; Cotton States and International Exposition – Gold Medal
- Practice: Bradford L. Gilbert; 1 Broadway, 50 Broadway; New York City, New York
- Buildings: Central Station Chicago; Flatiron Building (Atlanta); Tower Building (New York City)
- Projects: Albemarle Park; Cotton States and International Exposition
- Design: 1st steel-frame construction 1st skyscraper in New York City

Bradford Lee Gilbert (March 24, 1853 – September 1, 1911) was a nationally active American architect based in New York City. He is known for designing the Tower Building in 1889, the first steel-framed building anywhere and the first skyscraper in New York City. This technique was soon copied across the United States. He also designed Atlanta's Cotton States and International Exposition of 1895, the Flatiron Building in Atlanta, and many railroad stations.

== Background ==
Bradford was born in Watertown, New York, the son of civil engineer and banker Horatio Gates Gilbert and his wife Marie Antoinette (née Bacon). His uncle was Jasper W. Gilbert, a justice with the New York Supreme Court.

He attended Siglar's School in Newburg and the Sedgwick Institute in Great Barrington, Massachusetts. Later, he had private tutors at home in Irvington, New York to get ready to attend Yale University, rather than his father's alma mater Norwich University. However, Gilbert decided to forgo college as he was very anxious to learn architecture. He became a student with the architectural firm J. Cleveland Cady in New York City for five years, beginning in 1872.

In 1876, Gilbert was hired as an architect for the New York, Lake Erie and Western Railroad, under engineer Octave Chanute. Through his work with the railroad in the northern and northwestern states, Gilbert earned a reputation for originality. Although his body of work is diverse, he preferred Romanesque style and consistently featured "sinuous, interlaced patterns, virtuoso brickwork and deep red color effects".

By 1890, Gilbert opened a firm in his name at 1 Broadway in New York City, initially specializing in railroad and public buildings. He said, "It certainly costs no more, often not such much, to design a building that is architecturally correct, of good, quiet contour, the whole effect gained by constructional outlines, in place of the fancy 'ginger-bread' work too often adopted; and with the interior arrangements designed to meet every requirement."

Throughout his career, Gilbert also designed apartment buildings, churches, clubs, exhibition buildings, hospitals, hotels, houses, and office buildings. Gilbert did not just design buildings, he also managed the projects and visited the construction sites; this was documented in newspapers articles announcing his arrival in town to check on the progress of the projects.

This attention to detail may have paid off as many of his other projects steamed from his railroad connections, including designing residences for William H. Baldwin Jr. who was president of the Long Island Railroad, Alfred Skitt who was president of the New York City Interborough Railway Company, Arthur M. Dodge whose father built the Macon and Brunswick Railroad, Benjamin A. Kimball who was president of the Concord and Montreal Railroad Company, and William Greene Raoul president of the Atlantic and Birmingham Railway, the Central Railroad and Banking Company of Georgia, the Mexican National Railroad Company, and the Southwestern Railroad.

== Projects ==
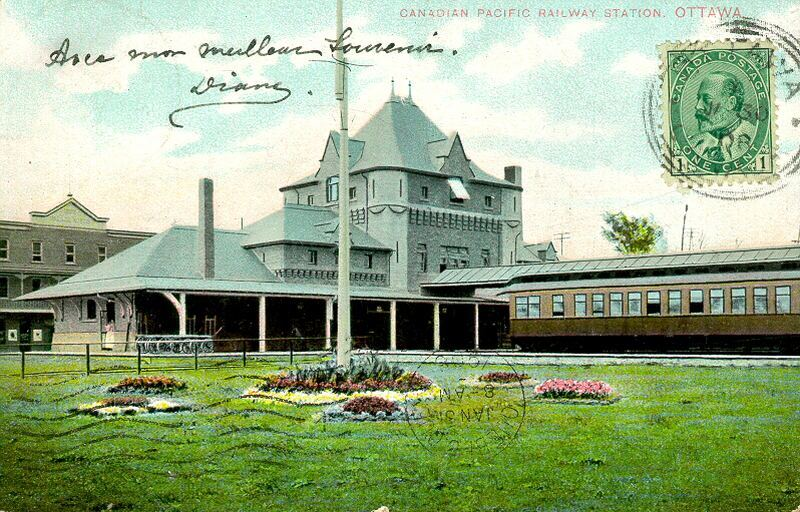
Ottawa Central Railway Station, Ottawa, Canada (1908)

=== Railroad stations ===
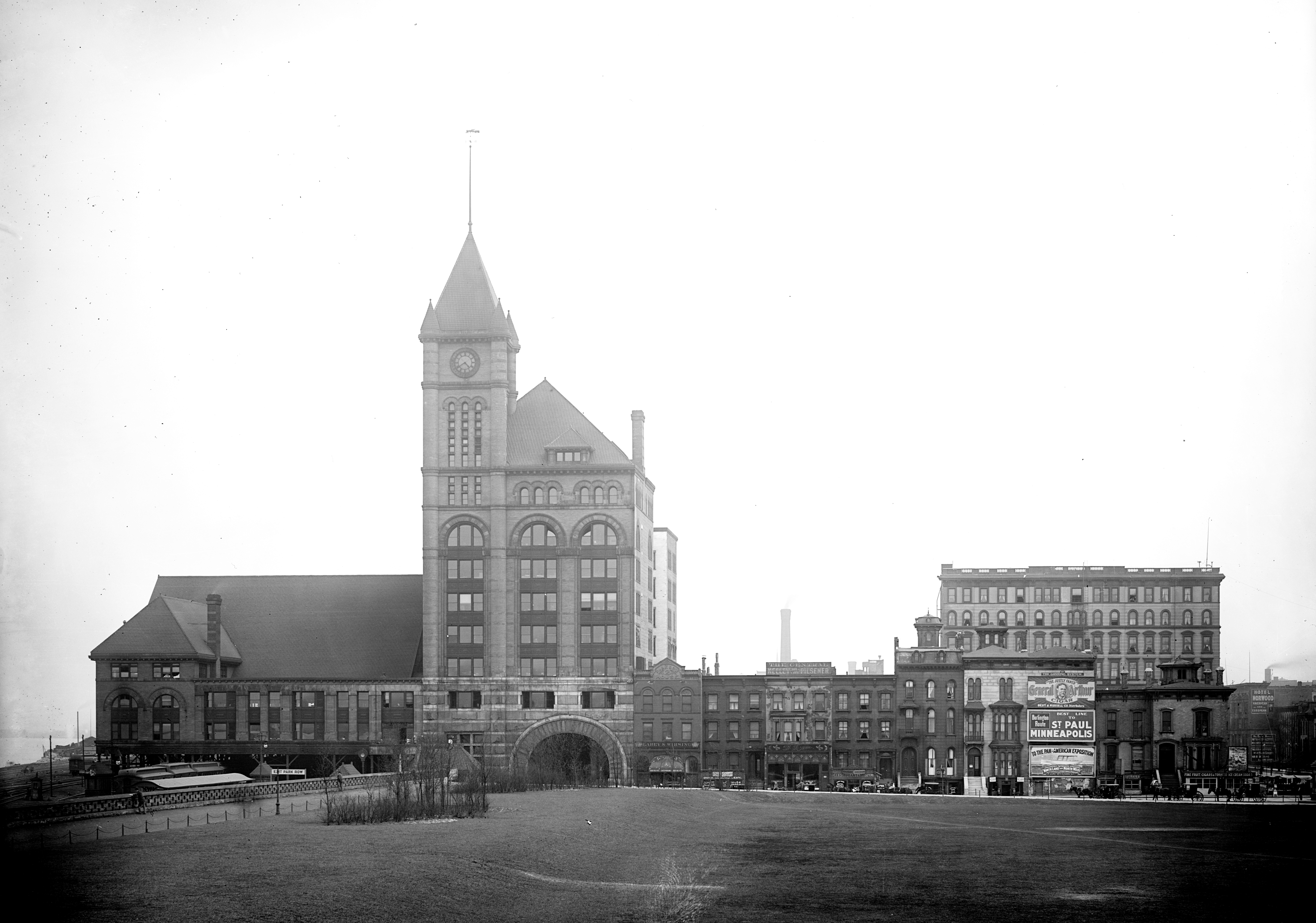
Illinois Central Terminus, Chicago (circa 1906)

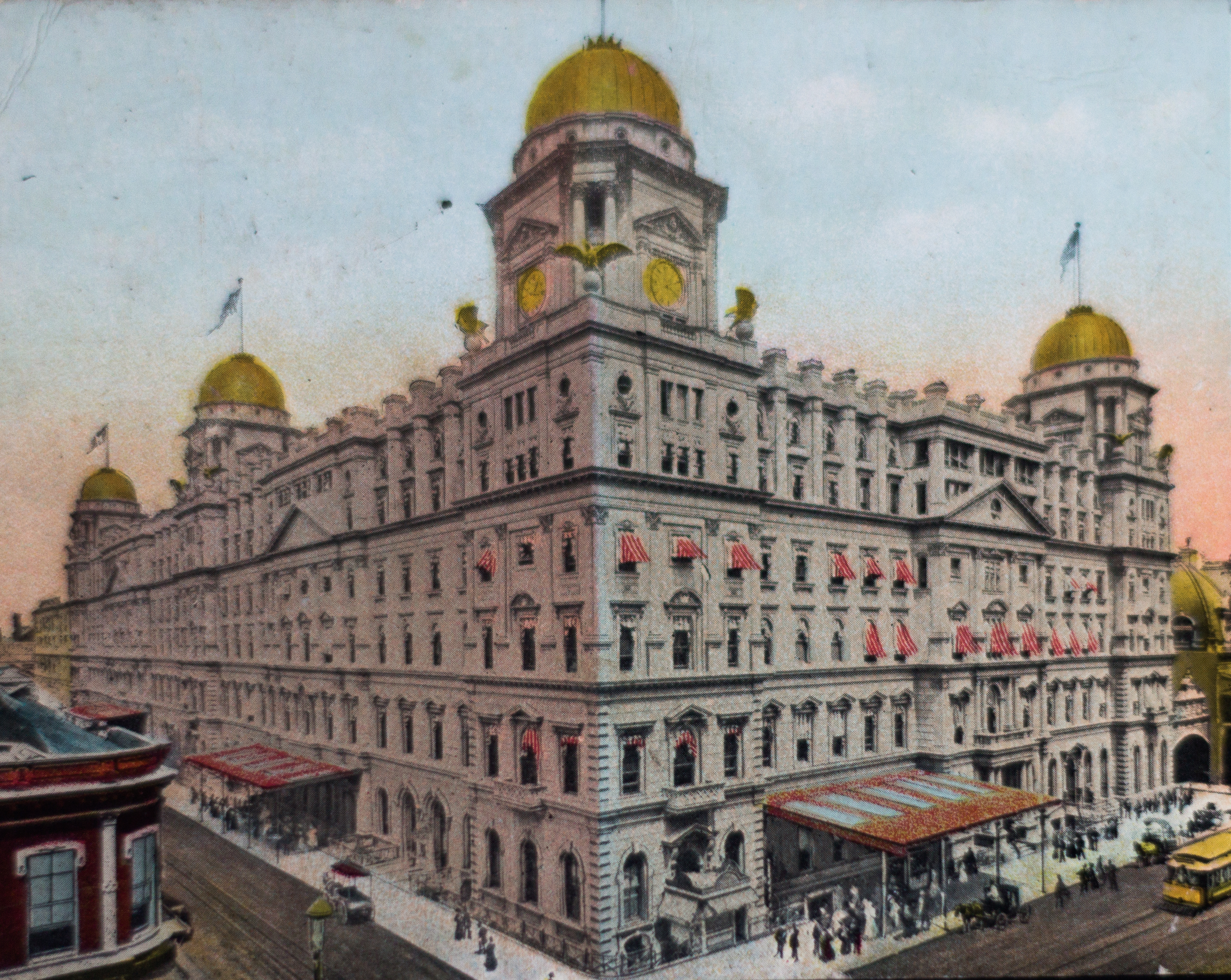
Grand Central Station, New York City (circa 1902)

As an architect with the New York, Lake Erie & Western Railroad, Gilbert designed many railroad stations and related buildings. Through his private practice, his railroad clients included the Atlantic Coast Line Railroad; Boston & Maine Railroad; Central Railroad of New Jersey; Concord and Montreal Railroad; the Delaware, Lackawanna & Western Railroad; Flint & Pere Marquette Railroad; Georgia Railroad Company; Grand Rapids and Indiana Railroad; Illinois Central Railroad; Intercolonial Railroad (Canada); Michigan Central Railroad; Missouri-Kansas-Texas Railroad; New York, New Haven and Hartford Railroad; Norfolk and Virginia Beach Railroad; Northern Pacific Railway; Old Colony Railroad; Philadelphia & Reading Company and others. In 1901, he designed the Ottawa Central Railway Station. He also designed stations, offices and terminals for the National Railroad of Mexico.

Gilbert designed the Illinois Central Terminus (also called Central Station) at 12th Street in Chicago—it was constructed in nine months for the 1893 for the World's Columbian Exposition. The location and use of the building created certain challenges given the brief that all fair buildings have impact and beauty; Gilbert's solution was to increase the size of the station and give it strong Romanesque details, as "the first impression gained of the building by the general public would be regarding its general contour and 'massing' as well as the outline skylines". In other words, it needed to be impressive at a distance. His design included a ten-story office building, with lobby and offices connected via a pneumatic tube service. The first three stories were built from dark speckled granite, with buff brick for the upper levels. The roof was dark glazed Spanish tiles, along with a coppery dome. Gilbert was also instructed to make the building fireproof. He achieved this in part by using the building's adjacent tower as a series of fire-proof vaults. The 15-story tower was also a functional clock tower. The cost of this project was over a million dollars, including the passenger station, waiting rooms, restaurant, office building, and a train shed that covered eight tracks. The waiting room was the largest in the world, at 100 by 150 feet (30 by 46 m) and 100 feet (30 m) high. This elaborate structure remained in use until it was demolished in 1974. It was called "the gateway to the city."

Gilbert was also the architect for the 1898 remodel of New York City's Grand Central Terminal—a project started in 1892 where "no expense is to be spared in making the building attractive". The actual cost was around $175,000 (equivalent to $6,270,833 in today's money). Gilbert designed the ten-story building in the Romanesque style. The front of the building had ornamental bronze panels and bay windows on the second story. The lower level was granite, with Indiana Limestone on top. Inside, there were tiled floors and deeply paneled ceilings, as well as pneumatic tubes to connect the lobby to the offices. This building was replaced by the current Grand Central Station in 1913.

Whether designing a large railroad station for New York City or a small station for a Mexican village, Gilbert believed the structure should be comfortable, functional, and aesthetically pleasing to be an asset to its community. In Engineering Magazine, Gilbert wrote, "No excuse should exempt a railroad company from being amenable to 'local pride.'" He also criticized designing public buildings in Queen Anne or other overly decorative styles as being both expensive to construct and to maintain.

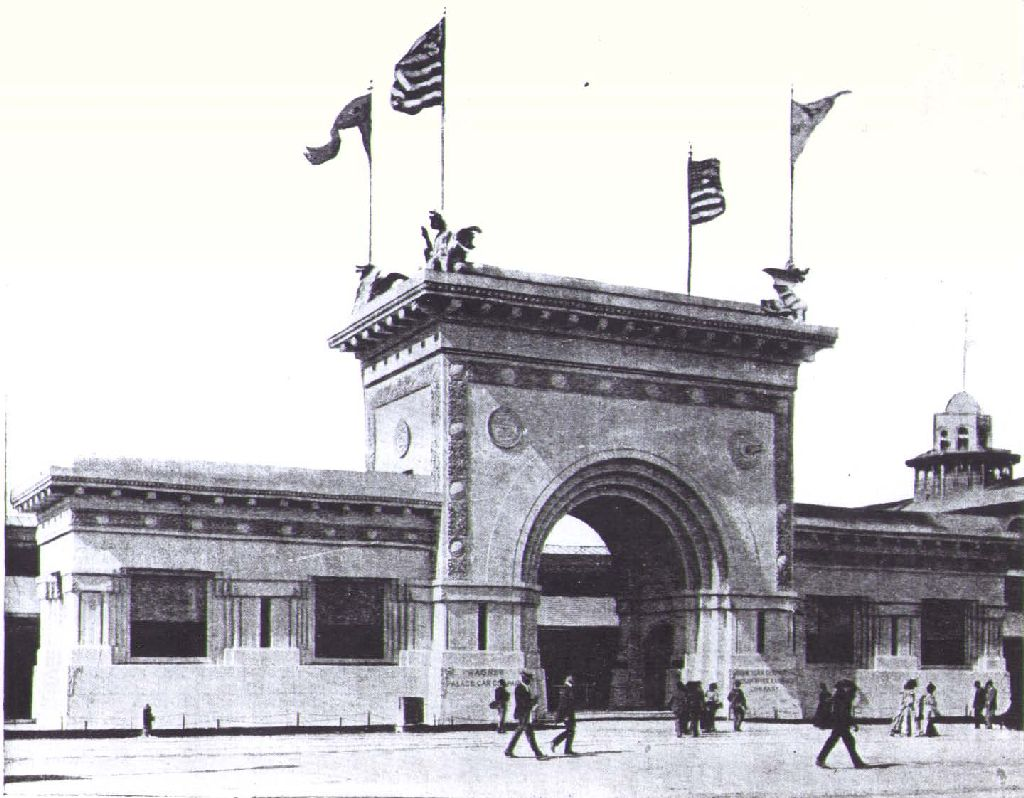
World's Columbian Exposition Building for the New York Central and Hudson River Railroad & Wagner Palace Car Co., Chicago, Illinois1893

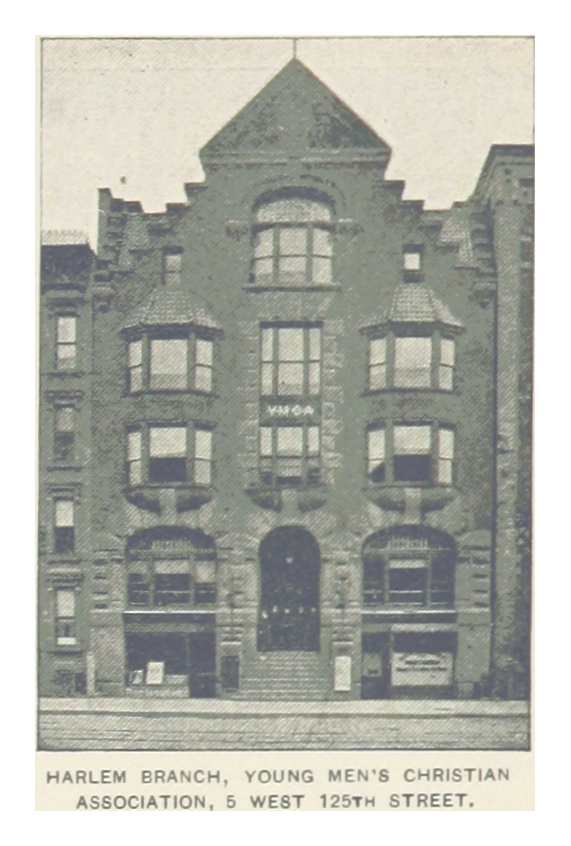
YMCA Harlem Branch, Harlem, New York City (1893)

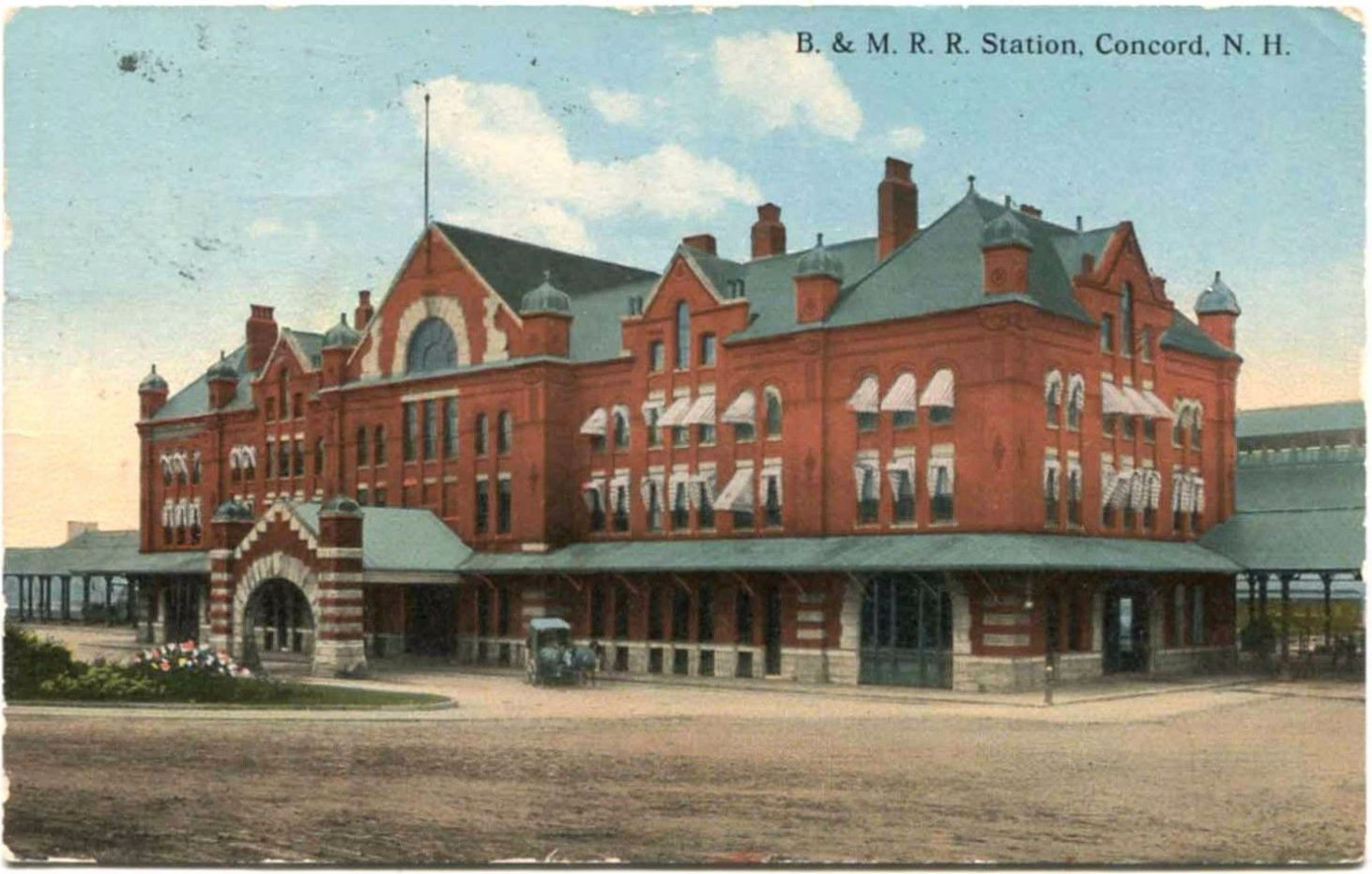
Concord Station, Concord, New Hampshire

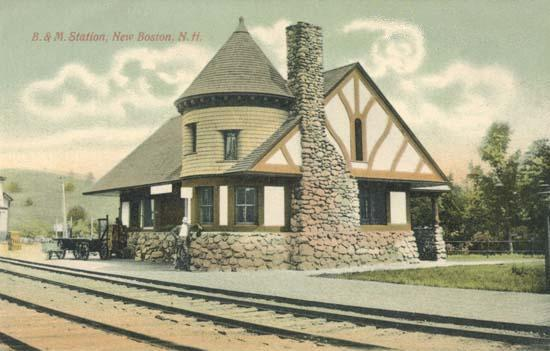
New Boston Depot, New Boston, New Hampshire

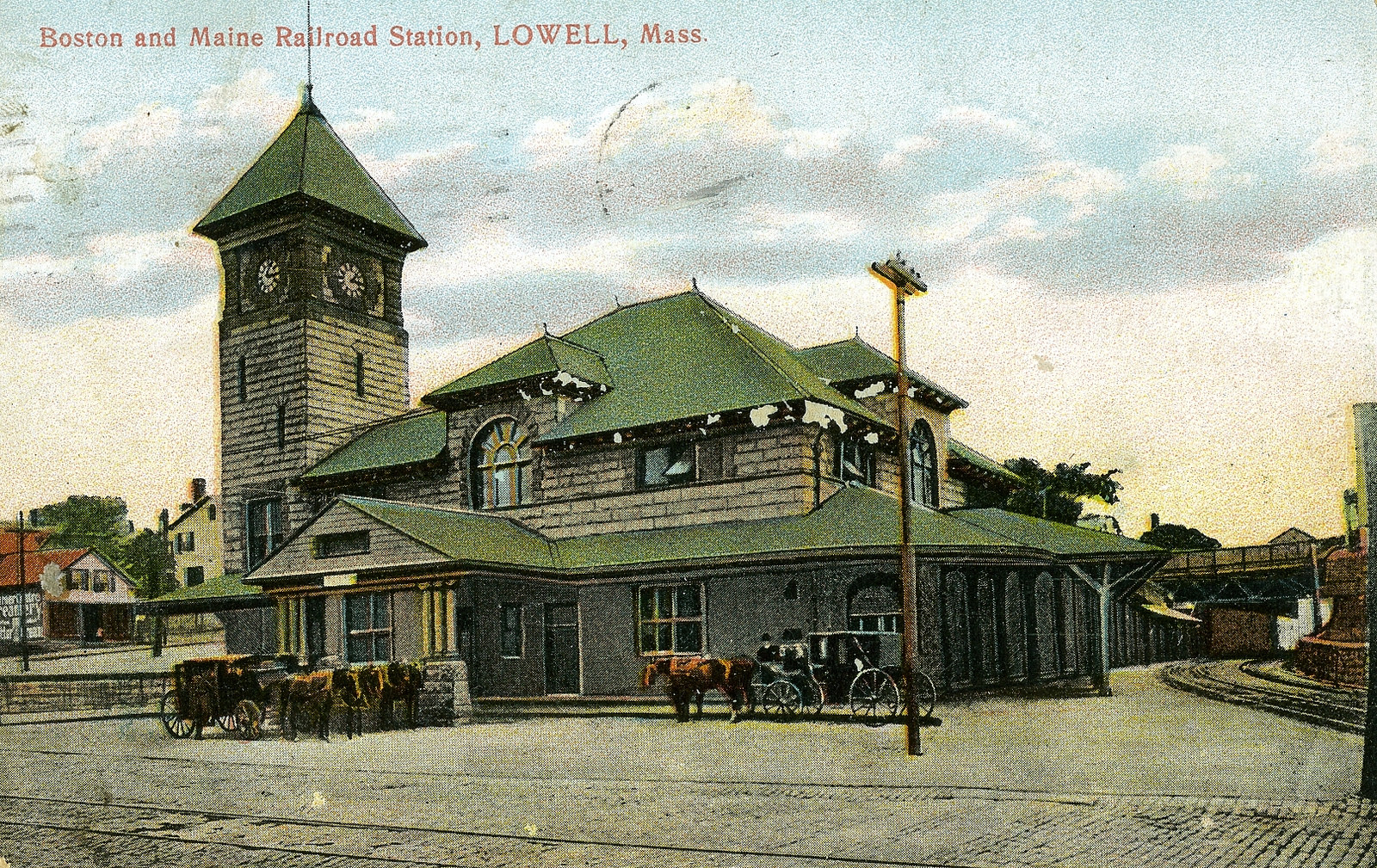
Middlesex St Station, Lowell Massachusetts

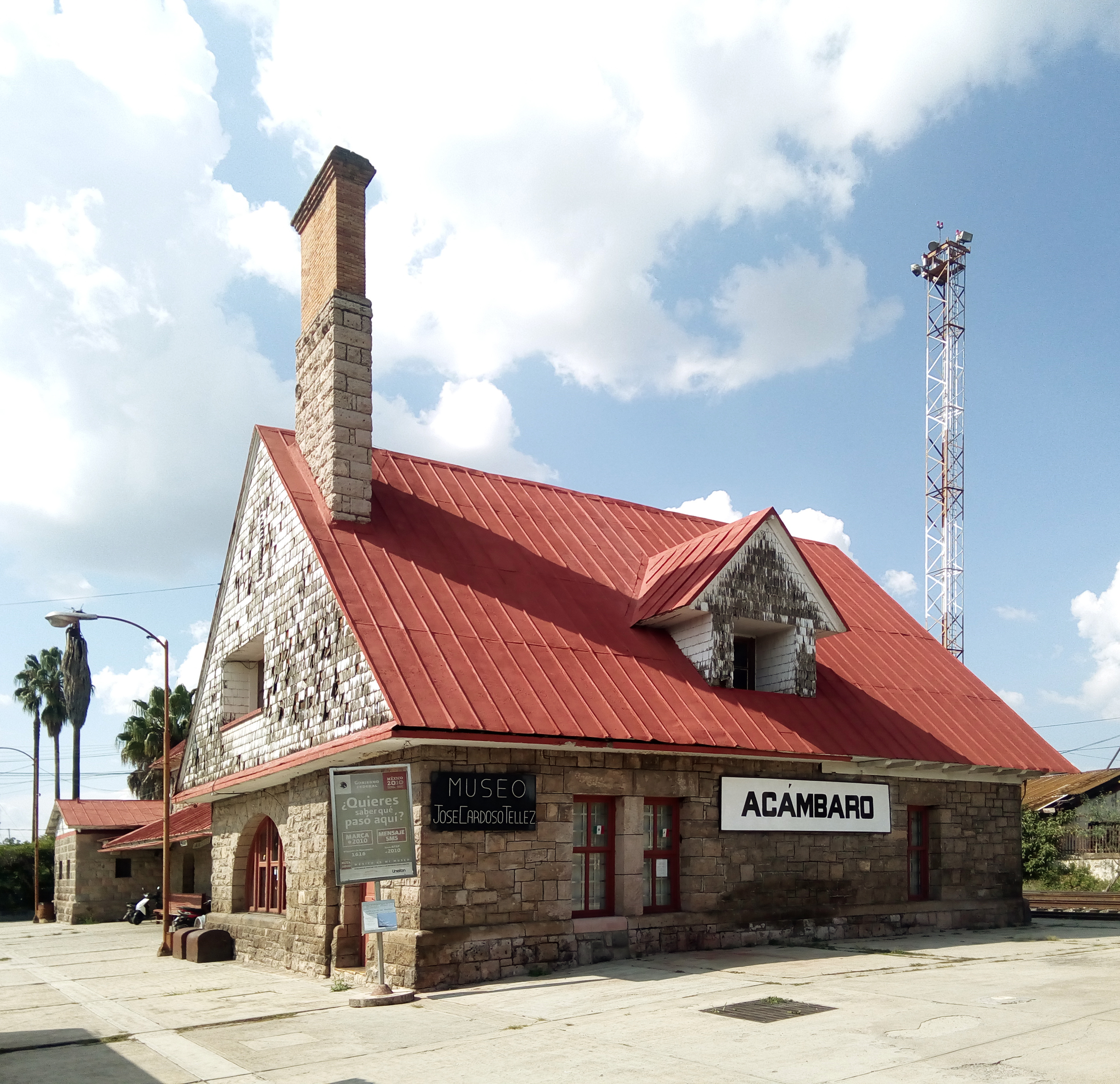
Acámbaro Station in Acambaro, Guanajuato, Mexico

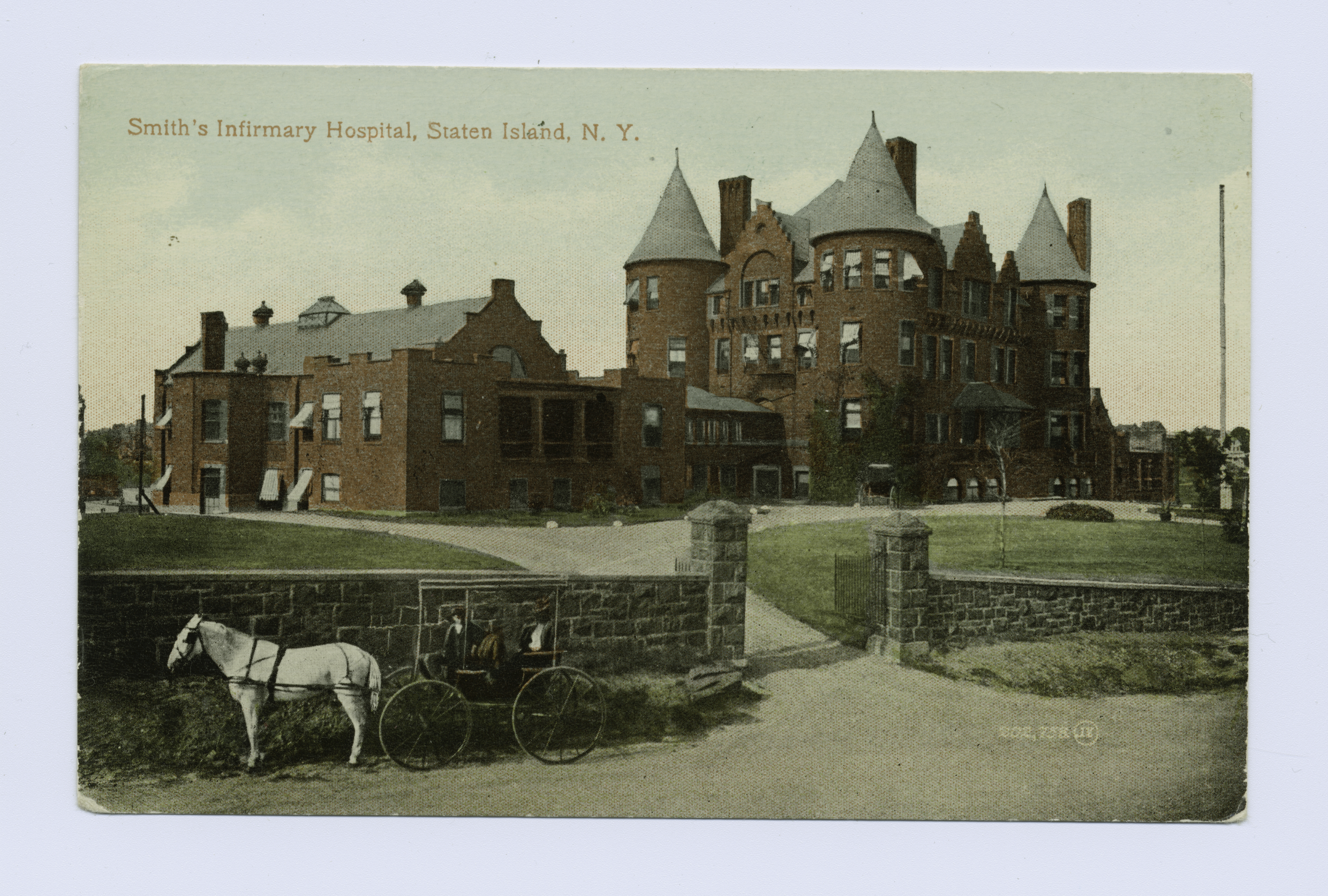
Samuel R. Smith's Infirmary Hospital, Staten Island, New York

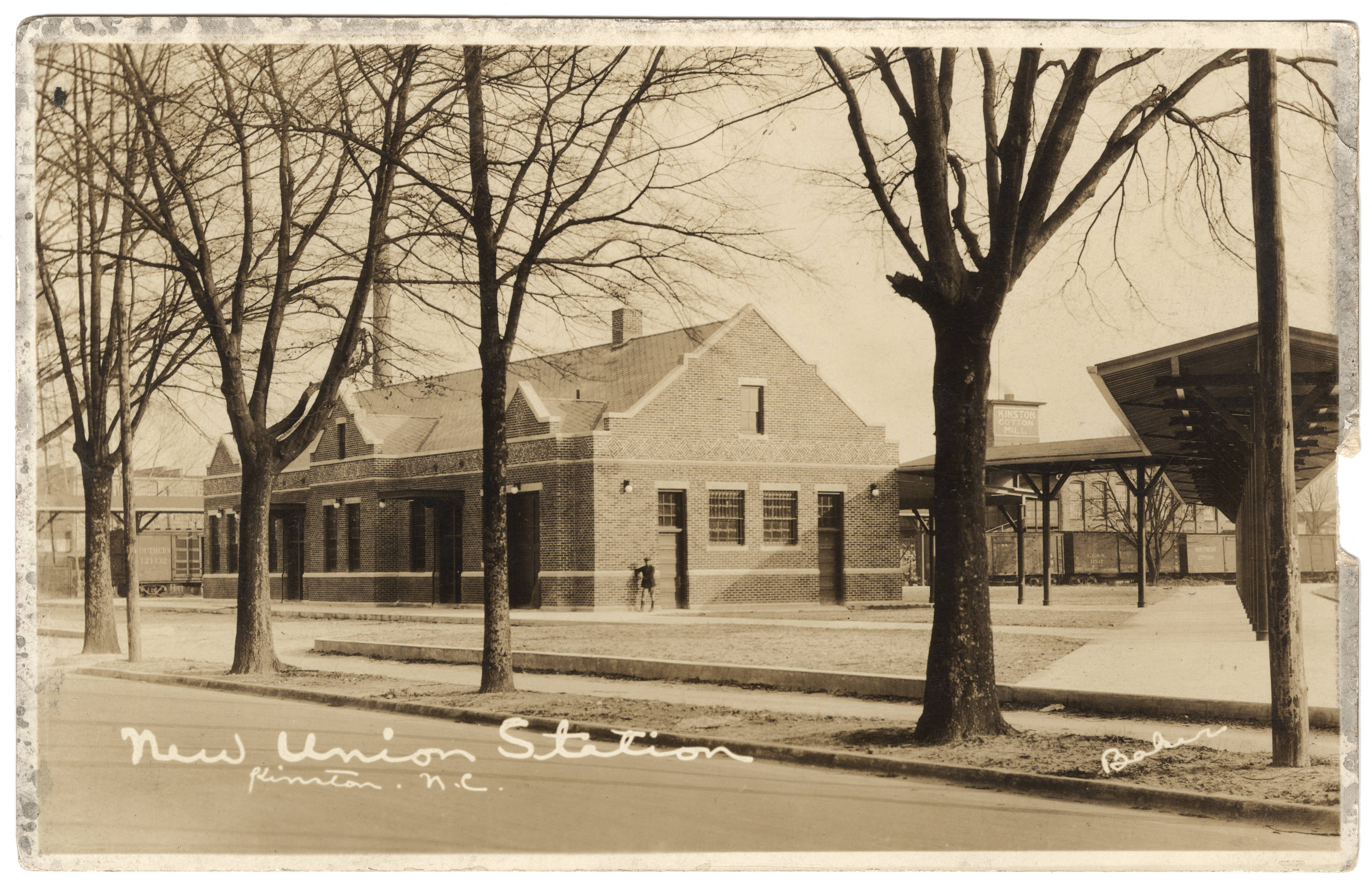
Kinston Union Station Kinston, North Carolina

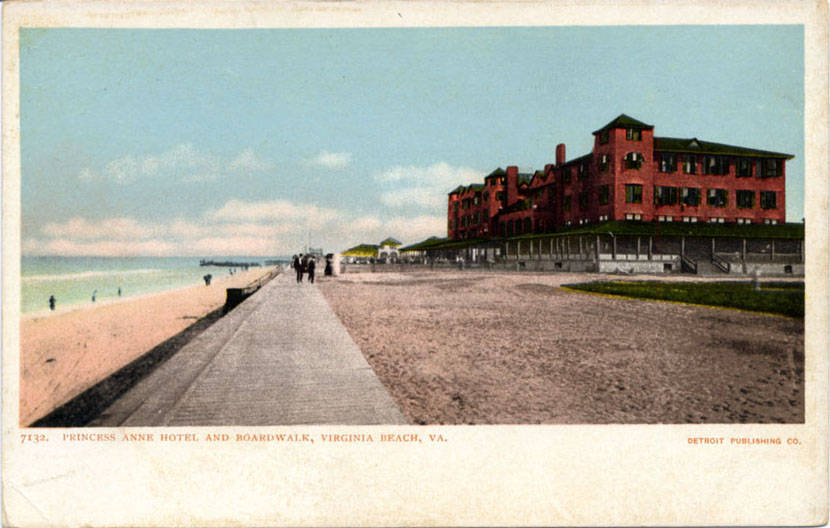
Virginia Beach Hotel (aka Princess Anne Hotel), Virginia Beach, Virginia

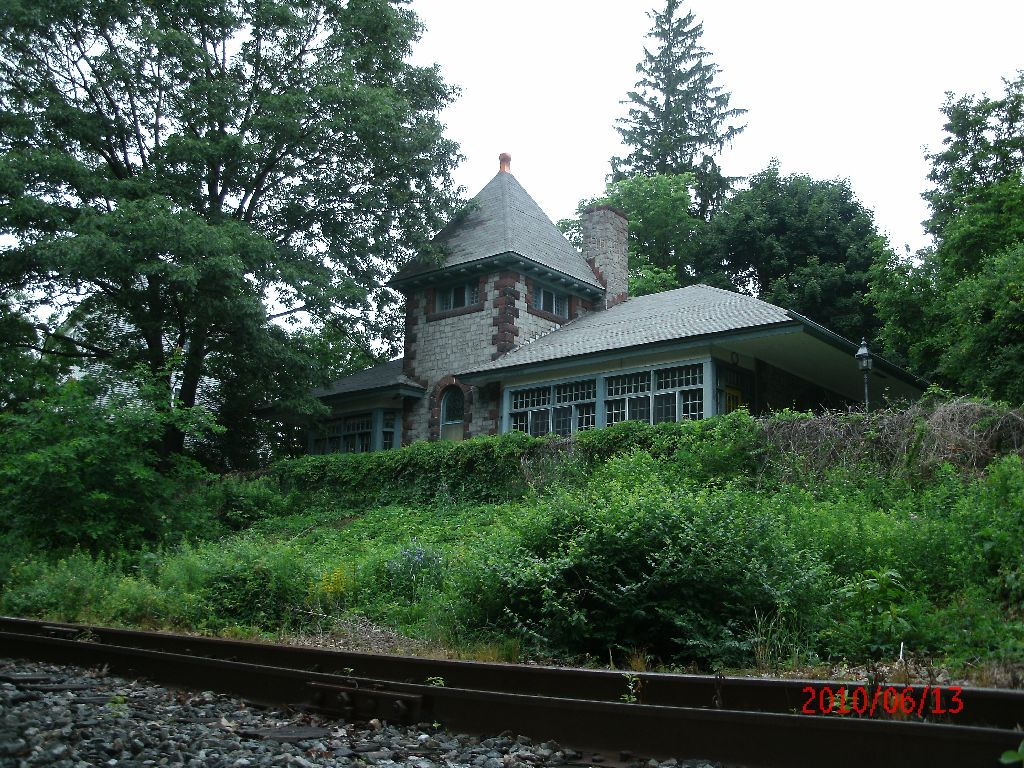
Amoskeag Passenger Station, Manchester, New Hampshire

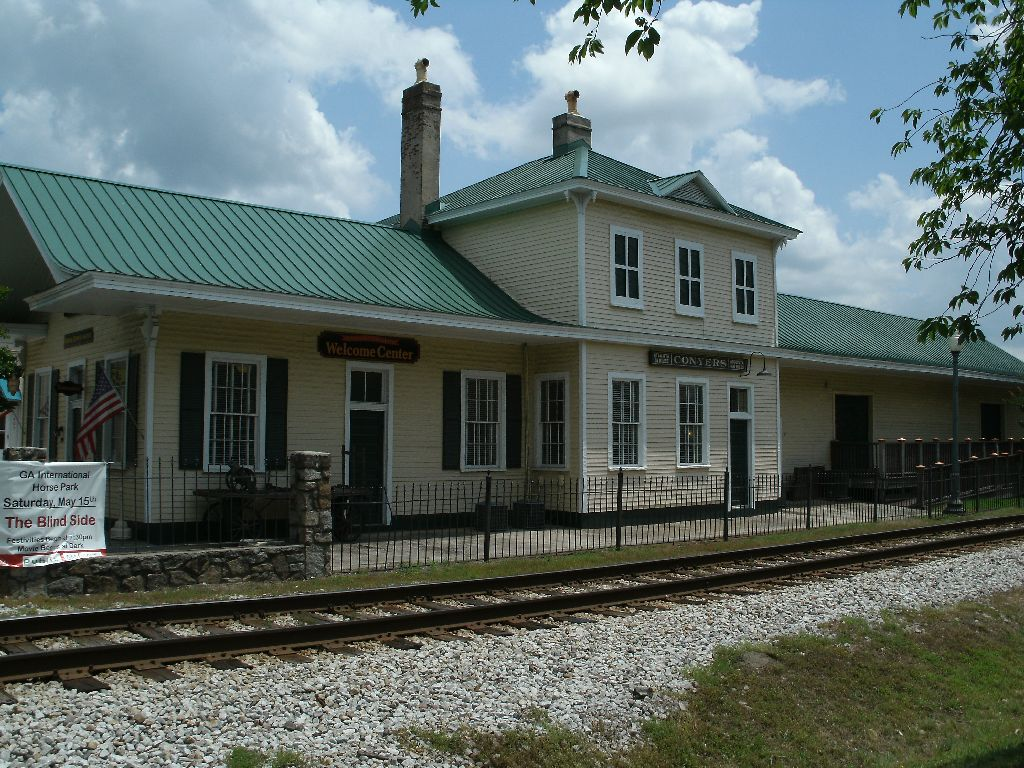
Conyers Passenger and Freight Station, Conyers Georgia

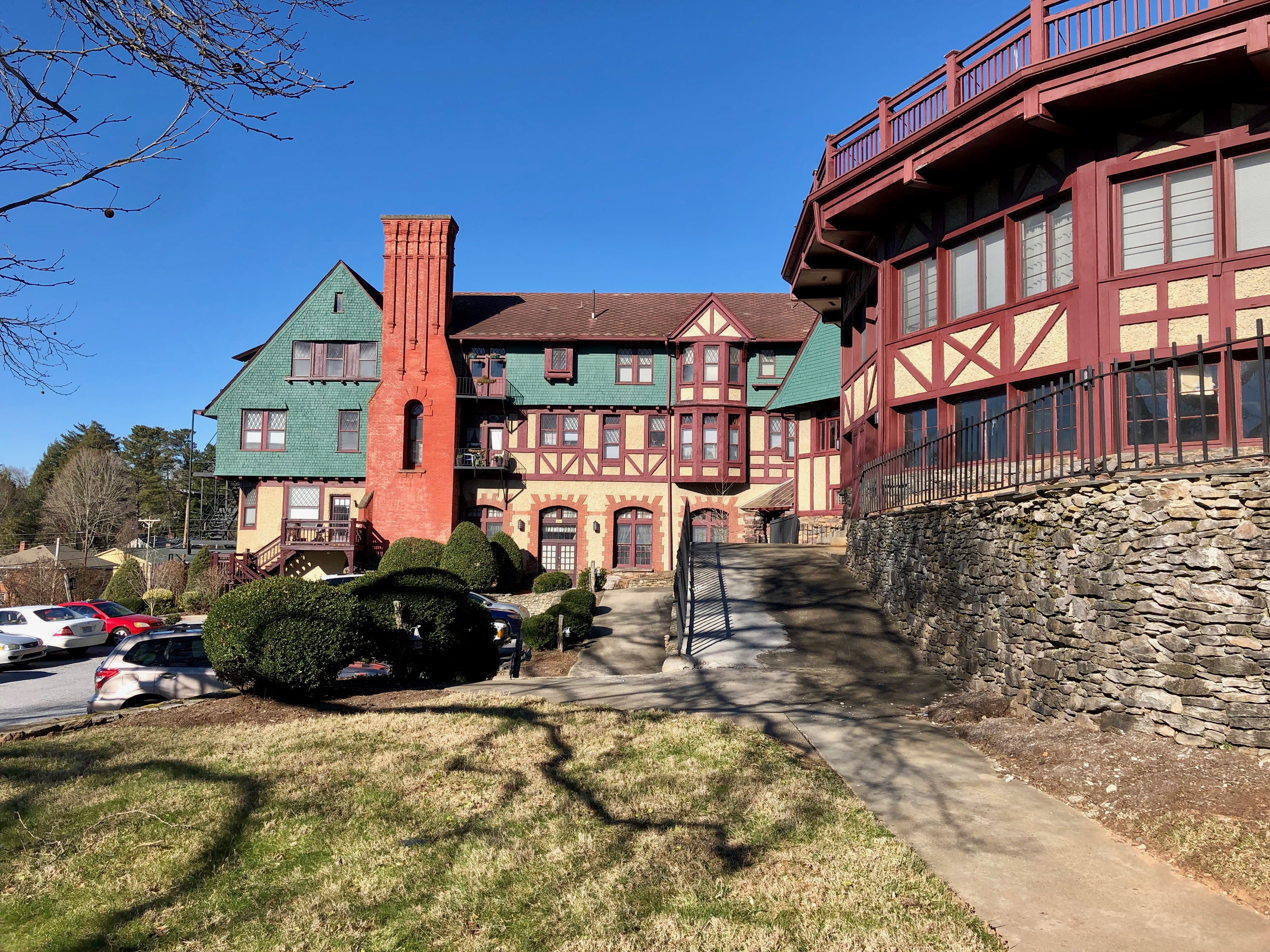
The Manor Inn, Asheville, North Carolina

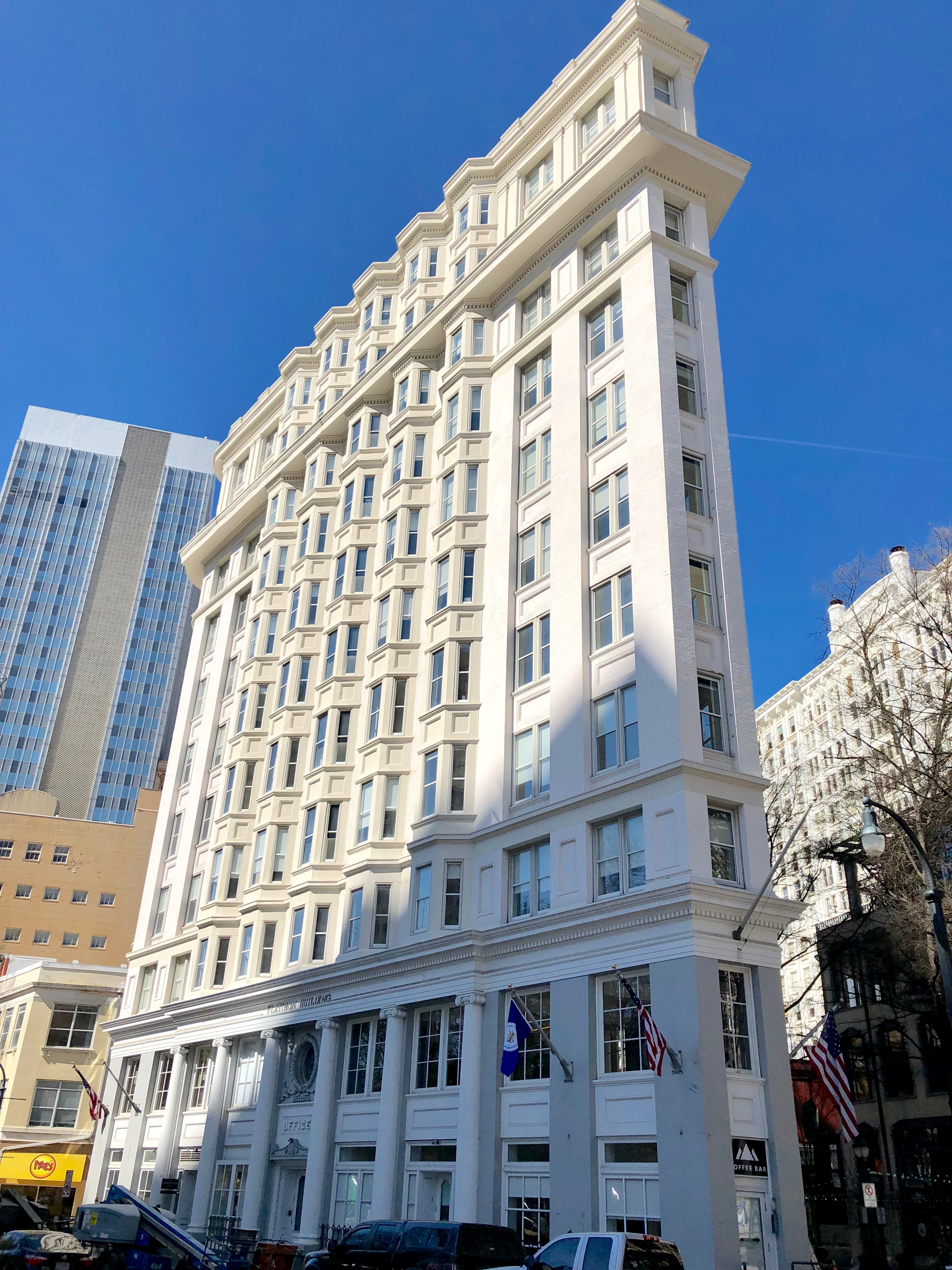
English-American Building (aka Flatiron Building), Atlanta, Georgia

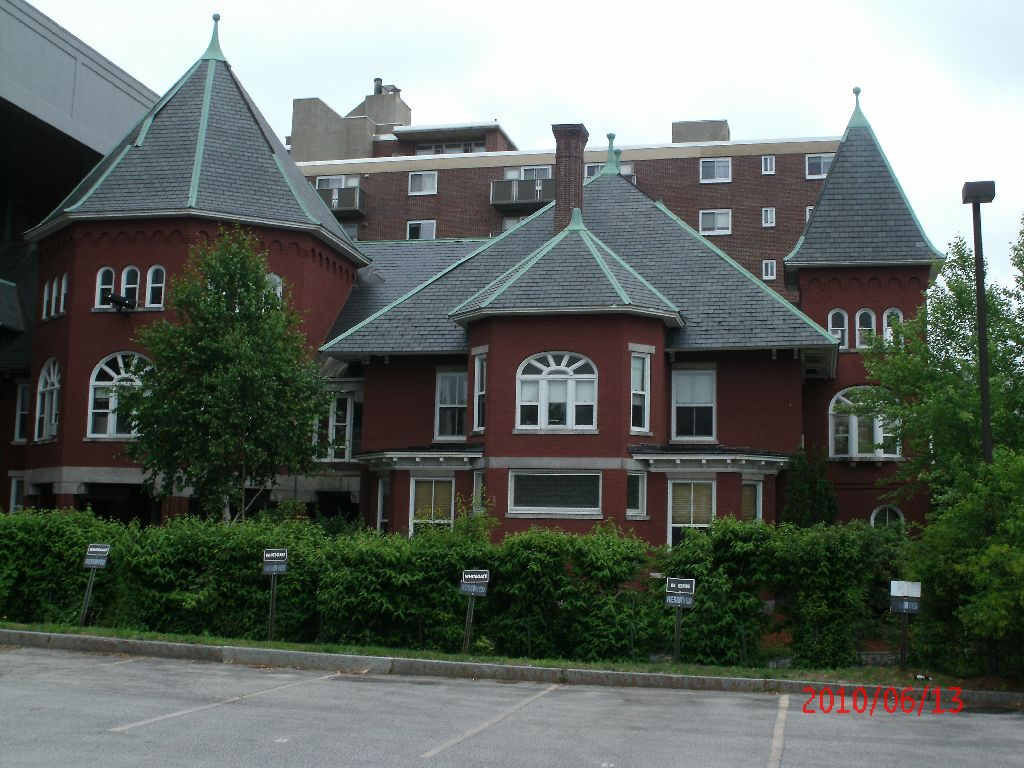
Benjamin Kimball Residence (now Capital Theater), Concord New, Hampshire

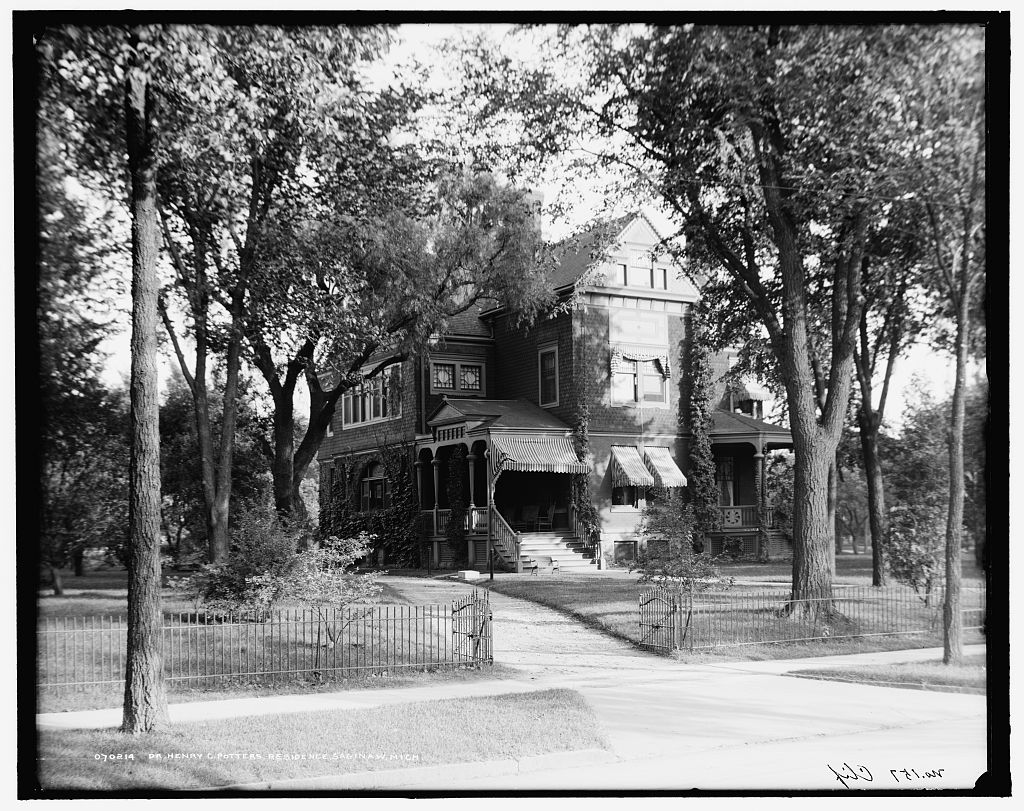
Dr. Henry C. Potter's residence, Saginaw, Michigan c. 1905. Courtesy Library of Congress

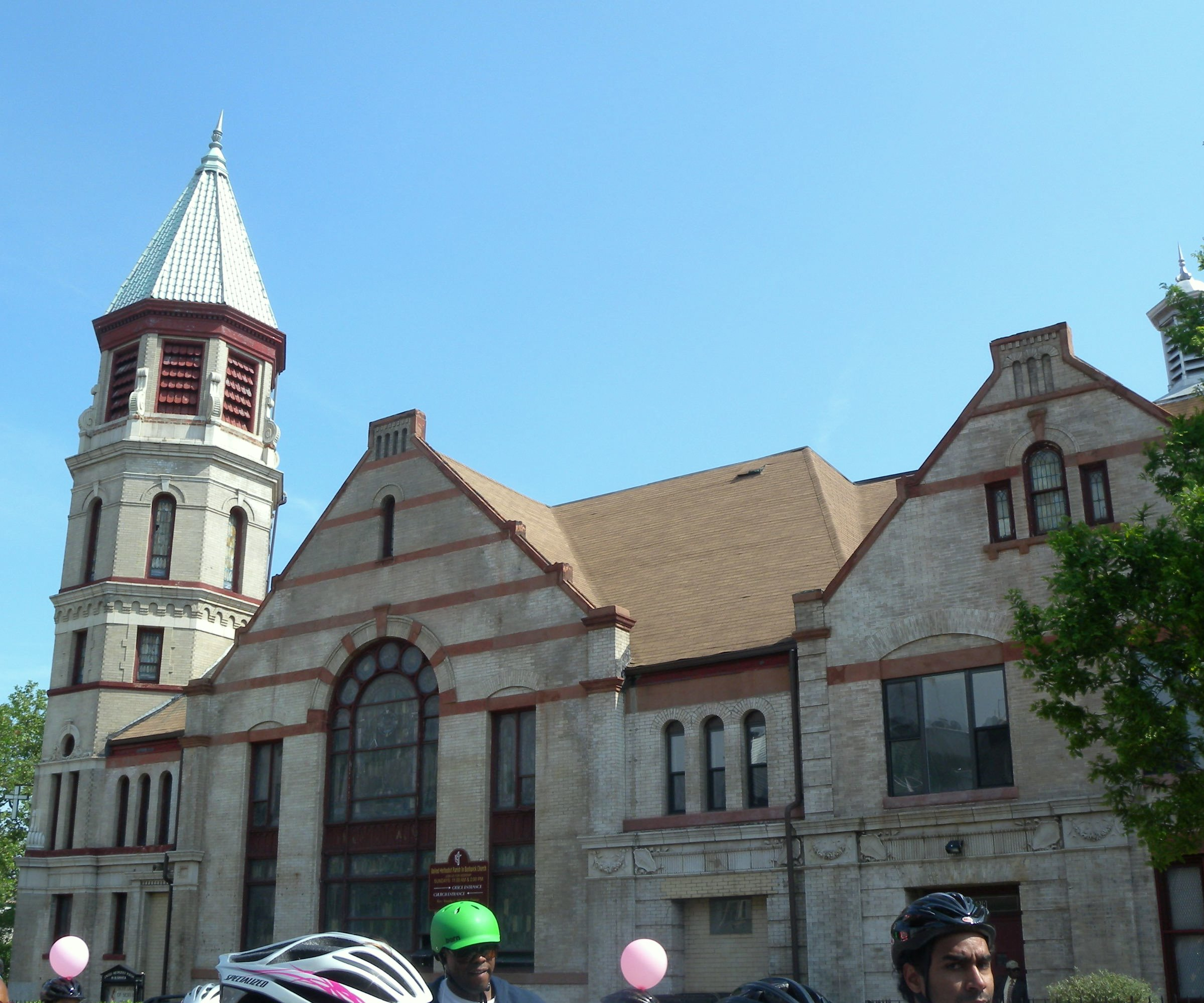
Epworth Memorial Church, now Bushwick United Methodist Church, Brooklyn, New York

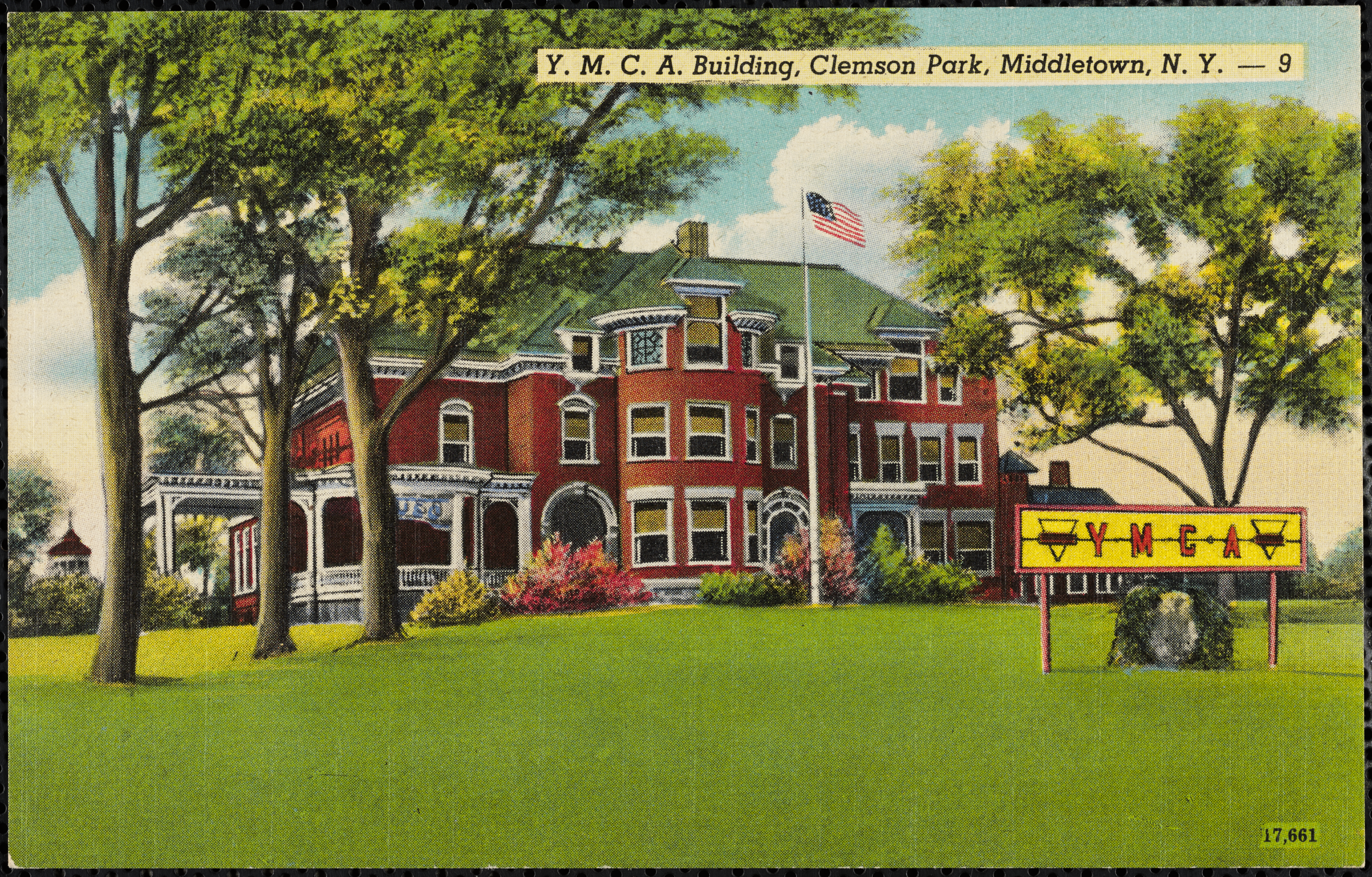
YMCA Building, Middletown, New York

=== World's Columbian Exposition ===
In 1893, Gilbert designed an exhibition building for the World's Columbian Exposition in Chicago for his clients the New York Central and Hudson River Railroad along with The Wagner Palace Car Co. The building contained wings on either side for railroad engines; inside was an exhibit showing photographs and sketches of Gilbert's work on railroad station architecture. The Exposition's board of directors gave Gilbert a gold medal "for a new type of American architecture". In 1895, the exhibit illustrations were published by Railway Gazette as a book, Sketch Portfolio of Railroad Stations and Kindred Structures. Gilbert noted that railroad buildings had been overlooked in the past, but were an excellent place "to illustrate the modern architecture".

=== Mason Stables ===
Edmund Coffin Jr., a prominent real estate investor and lawyer in New York City, hired Gilbert to design the Mason Stables. This project took three years to construct and was divided into two phases, 1881–1882 and 1883–1894. When completed, the Mason Stables were one of the most extensive livery stables in New York City. The five-story stables included 158 stalls and room for more than 300 carriages. Primarily Romanesque Revival in style, the building was decorated with some Celtic-style ornaments, repeating patterns in variegated orange-yellow and orange-red brick, and rows of repeating slender windows. One modern writer says, "The stables were nearly abstract, a field of dreams in orange, red, and yellow masonry." The New York City Landmarks Preservation Commission says, "Color and texture, rather than ornament, were skillfully used to give the structure its simple, yet monumental character."

Another unique aspect of the Mason Stables was its layout, as the stables wrapped around other buildings, resulting in three entrances—76th Street, 77th Street, and Amsterdam. Two of the entrances featured step-gables, a characteristic of Dutch Renaissance Revival style that Gilbert used with other public buildings in New York City as a nod to the city's origins as New Netherland. In 1912, the stables were remodeled into a car park and were renamed the Dakota Stables (not to be confused with a 19th-century facility with that name), and the Pyramid Garage in the 1950s. Over the years, the building lost many of its period details; it was demolished in 2011.

=== YMCA ===
Gilbert designed a Queen Anne style building for the YMCA in the Bowery. Known locally as The Bunker, the building was constructed in 1884. This was the first YMCA in New York City. It was converted into residences in 1932 and survives today as a New York City Landmark.

In June 1886, Gilbert was hired to design a building for the Harlem Branch of the YMCA. The building was located between 5th and 6th Avenues on the north side of 125th Street. It was brownstone on the lower levels and brick and terra cotta on the upper levels, with step-gables in the Dutch Renaissance Revival style at the 125th Street entrance. The $65,000 (equivalent to $2,329,167 in today's money) building included a gymnasium, a swimming pool, a bowling alley, five classrooms, a library, a parlor, a reception room, a reading room, and an auditorium that seated 800 people.

=== Tower Building ===
John Noble Sterns, a supporter of the Cremorne Mission where Gilbert was a trustee, hired Gilbert in 1888 to design an eleven-story office building in New York City. For such a tall building, traditional construction methods required very thick walls that would have dominated the lot that was just 21.5 feet (6.6 m) wide. Calling upon his railroad background, Gilbert thought of turning a railroad bridge on end, with iron girders to support the floors and external walls. This innovation of "skeleton construction" with "steel-framed curtain walls" allowed him to construct a skyscraper without having thick load-bearing walls. Another benefit of this construction technique was that it was fireproof.

To work around local building ordinances, Gilbert constructed a foundation that was four stories or 70 feet (21 m) tall, essentially the height of the adjacent buildings. This foundation was constructed of iron and Little Falls stone. Next, came ten stories constructed in Philadelphia and Tiffany brick, with an octagonal roof covered in Spanish tiles. The brickwork was colorful, and there was Celtic ornamentation similar to that of Mason Stables.

Opening in 1889, the Tower Building is considered New York City's first skyscraper and the first curtain-wall building in the world. It was initially greeted with great skepticism, with members of the public predicting it would blow over. Some people walked around the block rather than walk by it. Some engineers declared it "unsafe and impracticable". To assure the public of its safety, Gilbert moved his offices to its top floor and remained there until he stopped practicing. He also scaled the building in the middle of an 1889 hurricane to prove that the building was not vibrating with a plumb line. In 1889, Engineering News called it "a most skillful solution of an exceedingly difficult problem". Kobble's New York and Environs wrote, "The Tower Building, of No. 50 Broadway, with its fifteen stories, is a remarkable example of a clever utilization of a narrow plot of ground."

The Tower Building cost $250,000 (equivalent to $8,958,333 in today's money) to build. This was quite a bargain given that it was expected to earn $210,000 a year in rent, after taxes and upkeep. A building with traditional construction on the same lot would have only netted $30,000 a year in rent, due to the height limit of ten stories and thick walls reducing square footage. Because Gilbert had devised a way to double income from property, The Philadelphia Inquirer noted that "the old Knickerbockers who own real estate on Broadway and other gilt-edge thoroughfares in the lower part of New York have a new god in the person of Bradford L. Gilbert." The building was razed in 1914 to make way for a taller structure.

=== Fire Engine Company No. 258, Hook and Ladder Company No. 115 ===
During his career, Gilbert designed just one firehouse—for Engine Company No. 1 and Hook & Ladder Company No. 1 in Long Island City. Established in 1891, this company was the first professional firefighters in Queens. However, the first base of operation for this ladder company was a modest wood-frame shed. The department merged with that of New York City in 1898, and its name changed to Fire Engine Company No. 258 and Ladder Company No.115 in 1904.

Constructed between 1902 and 1904, Gilbert's granite building with 4 1/2 stories not only improved the working condition of the firefighters but also reflects the importance of this paid crew who fought fires at the Standard Oil refinery, row-frames, schools, tenements and factories such as the Pratt & Lambert varnish factory. New York City's Historic Districts Council says, "This building was one of the more ambitious firehouse projects undertaken by the department due to its size and level of architectural detail." Even the selection of the renowned Gilbert, rather than the city's usual firehouse architects, was a statement.

Calling on the origins of New York as New Netherland, Gilbert's designed the firehouse in Dutch Renaissance Revival style, with oversized limestone trim to offset the darker granite background. Gilbert had also used Dutch Renaissance Revival for other buildings in New York City, including the Harlem Branch YMCA building and the Samuel R. Smith Infirmary and Hospital in Staten Island. The fire house's site cost $20,000; the building was $60,000 (equivalent to $2,232,692 in today's money).

The firehouse is still in use and is listed as a NYC Individual Landmark.

=== Southern Projects ===
==== Virginia projects ====
In 1888, Gilbert designed the Virginia Beach Hotel, with its attached Terminal Station, for the Norfolk and Virginia Beach Railroad in Virginia Beach, Virginia. Later called the Princess Anne Hotel, this marked the beginnings of the beach resort, as well as Norfolk Southern Railroad.

In 1895, Gilbert designed the Mary F. Ballentine Home for the Aged at 927 Park Ave. in Norfolk, Virginia, for Thomas R. Ballentine. This facility was named after Ballentine's late wife as it was originally her idea. The Ballentine Home was intended to provide a non-institutional, home-like environment for elderly local women, "more specifically gentle folk of irreproachable family." Ballentine endowed the home when he died and it remained in Gilbert's building until new construction at a different location in 1952.

==== W.G. Raoul House ====
In 1891, wealthy railroad executive William Greene Raoul hired Gilbert to design his residence on Peachtree Street in Atlanta, Georgia. The ornate, gabled house and its estate included a wine cellar, a cottage for servants, a stable, and the first tennis court in Atlanta. This house was home to the Raoul family through 1914. During the 1940s, the Red Cross acquired the property and used the house as a blood donation and bandage rolling center; around 1950 the Red Cross built a modern building on the property, directly in the front of the Raoul house. The house was also surrounded by the Cabana Motor Hotel and the Biltmore Hotel, losing its original context on a street of mansions. The Raoul House was placed on the National Register of Historic Places in the 1980s but burned in 1991 while it was leased to a nightclub.

==== Cotton States and International Exposition ====
In 1895, Gilbert was the supervising architect for the Cotton States and International Exposition in Atlanta. For this world's fair event, he designed many structures, including the Administration Building with Main Entrance and Exits, the Agricultural Building, the Auditorium, the Chime Tower and Band Stand, the Electricity Building, the Fire Building, the Machinery Hall, the Manufacturers & Liberal Arts Building, the Minerals and Forestry Building, the Negro Building, the Semi-Circular Entrance, and Exit Gateway, the Transportation Building, and the United States Government Building.

There was a logic to his designs; for example, the Minerals and Forestry Building was constructed of natural Southern woods. At his suggestion, Bradford's designs were in the Romanesque style as this resulted in cost-effective temporary structures with a simple outline. Romanesque style was also a good way for Atlanta "to be seen as au courant with America's commercial trends." In addition to designing for the Exposition, he also created vendor buildings for the Southern Railway Company and the Atlantic Coast Line Railroad.

The Atlanta Constitution wrote, "The design for the Administration Building and Gateway is one of the handsomest of the entire Exhibition. The design...is a composite design of old baronial castles...these castellated turrets, those embattled ramparts, those ancient moats, the old swinging drawbridge, will prove a source of keen enjoyment and profit." Gilbert received a gold medal from the Exposition Directors for "the designing and building all of the fifteen principal structures within the limit of time and appropriation."

==== Albemarle Park and Manor Inn ====
After a family vacation in 1896, William Greene Raoul decided to make Asheville, North Carolina his family's summer home. Getting away from the heat of a Georgia summer may have been one goal. Still, his son Thomas contracted tuberculosis in 1897, and the mountain air of Asheville was believed to be a cure. Raoul and his son hired Gilbert to design Albemarle Park, a park-like resort development on 32 acres (13 ha) just outside of Asheville. Gilbert began with a small hotel called Manor Inn, five cottages and the Lodge (or Gatehouse) where the Raoul family lived at first. In 1902, he added three new houses, a wing to the Manor Inn, doubled the size of the dining room and added a stage for musicians. Known cottages credited to Gilbert include Clover, Columbus, Hollyhock, Marigold, and Milfoil.

To suit the mountain setting, Gilbert created a "resort with an English inn atmosphere," with grounds designed by landscape architect Samuel Parsons, Jr. This translated to a hybrid of Tudor Revival, Colonial Revival, Dutch Colonial Revival, and Shingle architectural styles, with exteriors that featured shingles, roughcast plaster, and timber framing. Built between 1898 and 1920, Albemarle Park would eventually consist of 42 structures—some designed by other architects—becoming one of America's first planned residential parks. Albemarle Park is now a National Register Historic District. The National Register says, "The Manor and Cottages compose a picturesque small historic district, evocative of Asheville's dramatic turn-of-the-century resort town boom era."

==== English-American Building ====
In 1897, Gilbert designed the English-American Building for Atlanta's English-American Loan and Trust Company—whose president was Rufus Bullock, a former Georgia governor. Located at the junction of Broad and Peachtree Streets, this triangular-shaped building with eleven stories was the second skyscraper in Atlanta. Its style was Neo-Classical and Neo-Renaissance, but the shape was modern. At a cost of some $400,000, the building included three electric elevators, 200 rooms, and electric lighting.

Within a year, the building's tenants included National Cash Register Co., Otis Bros. Co. (elevators), Rand McNally Co., Mutual Life Insurance Co., Southern Bell and many others along with its owners and the Knights of the Ku Klux Klan. Known as the Flatiron Building since 1916 because of its shape, this is the oldest remaining steel-framed skyscraper in Atlanta and one of the few non-railroad buildings by Gilbert that survive today. Dr. Elizabeth Lyon says, "The building plays an important role in its urban setting by establishing a sense of dignity and scale and helping to create a visually interesting sequence of spaces and styles in the central business area of the city."

==== South Carolina Inter-State and West Indian Exposition ====
Gilbert was the supervising architect for the South Carolina Inter-State and West Indian Exposition in 1901. Remarkably, he was responsible for all aspects of this Charleston world's fair event, from the buildings to the 250 acres (100 ha) grounds to its infrastructure, including roads, water, sewage, and electricity. Gilbert designed twenty large buildings, including the 320 foot (98 m) long Cotton Palace with and its 75 feet (23 m) tall dome, and the Administration Building, Agriculture Palace, Art Palace, Auditorium, and the Sunken Garden & Conning Tower Sculpture. The main buildings, with their domes, arcades, finials, and brackets, were all painted in off-white, giving the Exposition its name the Ivory City—a play on the White City of the World's Columbian Exposition of 1893

Gilbert's instructions for this fair were to create a "Southern motif" which seems noticeably lacking in the Italian and Spanish-Revival style he used. However, Gilbert gave the exposition a more romantic look than the Atlanta exposition, while also modernizing it with the Mediterranean-style that was, during the 1890s and early 20th-century, in fashion for commercial and residential buildings Rather than Southern plantation architecture, it seems that Gilbert was influenced by the fair's goal of reminding commercial interests of the once lucrative trade route between the West Indies and the port of Charleston. Thus, architect Bruce Harvey concludes "The architecture at Charleston's exposition both reflected and promoted this conscious hope for the future." The architectural critic Montgomery Schuyler wrote, "At Chicago, they called the style Columbian; at Buffalo, they called it Pan-American...in Charleston—the Spanish Renaissance of the Sixteenth Century."

Gilbert's layout divided the fair into sections, suggesting that he studied that of the widely successful Columbian Exposition. His idea was to split the grounds into areas for the natural and artificial, connected by a "narrow neck" that included the Administration Building. Like Frederick Law Olmsted in Chicago, Gilbert used the natural setting—in this case, live oaks and magnolias along the Ashley River—to give structure to his Natural Section that included the Art, Machinery, Negro, various states, Transportation, and Women's Buildings. Gilbert wrote that the Natural section "will form a natural park of endless beauty of vista and landscape effect naturalistic [sic.]...a winding path of 100 feet in width will be carried underneath the overspreading live oaks along the edge of the embankment."

The artificial or Art Section was formal with architecturally similar buildings: the Palaces of Agriculture, Commerce, and Cotton. Gilbert sited this section over the former Washington Race Course, a flat area that was already treeless, allowing him to create "complex geometrical design" for the Court of Palaces which was surrounded with a sunken garden and connected by a colonnade. After the exposition, the majority of its temporary buildings were razed; the bandstand is the only structure from the event that survives.

However, Gilbert and the expedition quarreled over his compensation for work. In May 1902, Gilbert appeared in court for his lawsuit against the exposition for $16,422.80, the balance due on his $34,422.30 invoice (equivalent to $1,280,907 in today's money). In return, the exposition sued Gilbert for $51,000 (equivalent to $1,897,788 in today's money) in damages and loss of business due to his failure to complete the construction of all of the buildings by the opening date.

==== Atlanta Railroad Station ====
In 1902, Gilbert was paid $1,000 (equivalent to $37,212 in today's money) by Atlanta to draw plans for a new railroad station.

=== Canadian Projects ===
In 1901, he designed the Ottawa Central Railway Station.

In 1905, Gilbert and Henry Janeway Hardenbergh, also an architect from New York City, collaborated on the redesign and expansion of the Windsor Hotel in Montreal, Canada. Construction began in the spring of 1906 to create one of the largest hotels in North America of its day. Built of a steel frame and stone, the hotel was increased to a height of eight stories, with 250 new rooms and 175 new bathrooms. The combined total of old and new construction was 800 rooms and 450 baths, as well as a new double entrance through a rotunda.

In July 1905, Gilbert and Hardenbergh were selected to design a new hotel at the existing Grand Union Hotel site in Ottawa, Canada. This one-million-dollar project was to include 300 hotel rooms.

== Personal ==
In 1872, Gilbert married Cora Rathbone, daughter of the late Captain John Rathbone, in Brooklyn, New York. He was 19 and she was seventeen or eighteen years older. From its beginning, this was an unhappy marriage.

Gilbert was an elder with the University Presbyterian Church in New York City, and later an elder with the Westminster Presbyterian Church. He was a member of the American Institute of Architects—New York Chapter, the Architectural League of New York, the National Arts Club, the National Sculpture Society, the Quill Club, the Riding Club, and the Transportation Club, as well as the Chicago Club in Illinois.

Gilbert was a supporter and trustee of the McAuley Water Street Mission (now the New York City Rescue Mission) which was founded in 1887 by missionaries Jerry McAuley and his wife Maria, to give shelter and food to the poor. McAuley and his wife were Christian converts who were previously an alcoholic convict and an alcoholic prostitute, respectively. After her husband's death in 1884, Maria McAuley (née Fahy) became the Matron of the Cremorne Mission which Gilbert was a trustee. In 1885, Gilbert was secretary of a committee that raised funds for a public drinking fountain in memory of McAuley.

Gilbert separated from his wife in January 1887. In June 1887, he filed for an annulment in Jersey City, New Jersey, on the basis that he was underaged at the time of his marriage, with his wife being seventeen years his senior. On October 13, 1887, Cora Gilbert served her husband with divorce papers during the intermission of a prayer meeting at Cremorne Mission. Her claim was on the basis of infidelity, to be heard in the superior court at White Plains. At the same time, she served Maria McAuley with a $50,000 lawsuit for alienation of affections, with allegations that "were numerous and specific." Cora claimed she had been driven from her home, that her husband was abusive, and his attention had been diverted to Mrs. McAuley.

On October 16, 1887, at the Mission, Gilbert made a public announcement saying, "If it did not affect this mission and the noble Christian woman who conducts it, I would remain silent. I suppose you have all read in today's papers...a story reflecting upon Mrs. McAuley and myself. I pronounce it false. All those who know me will take my word, and all those who do not know me will see by the result that what I say is true." Standing by Gilbert were banker A.S Hatch, real estate agent Sidney Whittemore, Franklin W. Coe, and other ladies and gentlemen associated with McAuley Mission. Hatch also spoke, saying "The very fact that I am on this platform tonight is sufficient for the purpose without saying a word; but I may add that my faith in Mrs. McAuley and Mr. Gilbert has not been shaken one jot by what has appeared in print, and I continue to have unwavering confidence in both." McAuley "emphatically denied" the allegations. Later, Gilbert said his wife was influenced by would-be blackmailers. After Gilbert obtained a divorce, Cora withdrew the lawsuit against Maria.

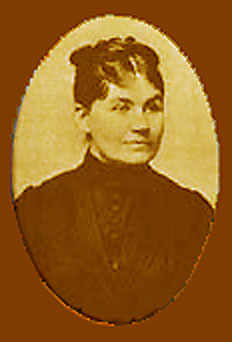
Maria McAuley

Five years later, McAuley's health declined and doctors believed she would die. She resigned from her position at Cremorne Mission and moved to Cranford, New Jersey. Gilbert discontinued his association with the Mission when McAuley left. On May 12, 1892, in Cranford, Gilbert married McAuley "when her health was poor and took care of her." Newspapers announcements said they had courted for five years, and that he was 38 and she was 55 years old. (Note: McAuley's exact birth date is unknown. If she was 55 at the time of her marriage to Gilbert, she would have been born in 1837. Her obituary in The New York Times states that she was 78 in September 1919 when she died. If that age is correct, she would have around 51 years old when she married Gilbert, having been born around 1841. The 1870 US Census recorded that she was 27 and was born around 1843, while the 1910 US Census says she was 55 and born in 1855. In any event, it appears that McAuley was older than Bradford by several years.) The Gilberts initially lived in a cottage on Madison Avenue, before moving to 225 Park Place in Brooklyn. They also owned a summer home in the Catskills. They adopted their niece Blossom, the daughter of Maria's sister.

Around 1887, Gilbert acquired nearly 1,000 acres (400 ha) in Roscoe, New York. There, he constructed his summer retreat, Beaverkill Lodge, named for the nearby river. This frame structure was clad in shingles and featured leaded Swiss-style sash windows, gas lighting, running water, and a turret. Maria, who was an Irish immigrant, said the Catskill scenery reminded her of Ireland. She named the surrounding hamlet Craig-e-Clair which translates as "beautiful mountainside". The Gilberts sold the property in 1903. In 1907, Beaverkill Lodge was acquired by Ralph Wurts-Dundas who built Dundas Castle or Craig-e-Clair which encapsulated Beaverkill Lodge, based on documentary photos.

There is evidence that Gilbert and Maria were close, with her joining him on various business trips. While designing the 1895 Cobblestone Church in Schenectady, New York, Gilbert donated $800 to build its clock tower in honor of Maria. He incorporated a clock he acquired from the New York Central Railroad. Gilbert, who was notoriously against ornamentation, also added Celtic designs to several buildings around the time of his marriage to Maria, including the Mason Stables and the Tower Building.

The Brooklyn Daily Eagle reported that Gilbert was recovering from a "severe illness" on August 14, 1904. On March 15, 1908, the Gilberts conducted services at the Water Street Mission. Gilbert began designing the yacht Jerry McAuley as a gift to The Salvation Army in June 1908. In his June 1911 dedication speech for the ship and launch of the Salvation Army Navy before a crowd of 5,000 people, Gilbert said, McAuley was "the missing link between what the church thought it could do and what God could really do." In April 1911, Gilbert was working on designs for a new building to replace the Jerry McAuley Water Street Mission. The new $100,000 building was to include a chapel, dormitories, and modern bathrooms.

On September 1, 1911, at age 58, Gilbert died of dropsy at his summer house in Accord, New York. His last architectural design was for a new mission.

== Selected works ==
Many of the surviving buildings by Gilbert are on the National Register of Historic Places (NRHP).

| Building Name | Date | Client | Location | Status | References |
|---|---|---|---|---|---|
| Albemarle Park and The Manor Inn | 1898 | Thomas W. Raoul and William G. Raoul | Asheville, NC | NRHP | |
| Acámbaro "Class" Passenger Station | 1892 | Mexican National Railroad | Acámbaro, Mexico | museum | |
| Alfred Skitt Residence | 1903 | Alfred Skitt | N. Broadway, Yonkers, NY | | |
| Amoskeag Passenger Station | 1892 | Concord & Montreal Railroad | Manchester, NH | residence | |
| Annandale Passenger Station | 1899 | Central Railroad of New Jersey | Annandale, NJ | razed | |
| Arthur Murray Dodge House | bef 1895 | Arthur Murray Dodge, Esq. | New York City, NY | | |
| Ashmont Railroad Station | 1895 | New York, New Haven & Hartford Railroad | Ashmont, MA | razed | |
| Avon Station | 1879 | New York, Lake Erie & Western Railroad | Avon, NY | standing | |
| Bay Port Passenger Station | 1903 | Long Island Rail Road | Bay Port, Long Island, NY | razed | |
| Beaverkill Lodge (Dundas Castle) | 1891 | self | Roscoe, NY | remodeled | |
| Benjamin A, Kimball Residence (expand/remodel) | 1884 | Hon. Benjamin Ames Kimball | Concord, NH | theater | |
| Berkeley Arms Hotel | 1883 | Pennsylvania Railroad Company | Berkeley Township, NJ | burned 1904 | |
| Bernardsville Passenger Station | 1901 | Delaware, Lackawanna & Western Railroad | Bernardsville, NJ | NRHP, repurposed | |
| Beverly Depot | 1897 | Boston and Maine Railroad Co. | Beverly, MA | NRHP | |
| Bridgewater Station | 1894 | New York, and New Haven Railroad Co. | Bridgewater, MA | repurposed | |
| Brockton Twin Passenger Stations | 1894 | New York, New Haven and Hartford Railroad | Brockton, MA | razed | |
| Campello Twin-Passenger Stations | 1889 | New York, New Haven and Hartford Railroad | Brockton, MA | razed | |
| Canton Junction station | 1893 | Old Colony Railroad Co. | Canton, MA | still in use | |
| Carteret Club | 1889 | Carteret Club of Jersey City | Jersey City, NJ | school | |
| Children's Hospital Reception Building & Nursery | 1889 | | New York City, NY | | |
| Cobblestone Church | 1895 | 2nd Reformed Protestant Church | Schenectady, NY | still in use | |
| Colonia Terminal Passenger Station & Railroad Office | 1895 | Mexican National Railroad | Colonia, Mexico | razed | |
| Concord Station, Train Shed, and Office Building | 1885 | Concord and Montreal Railroad | Concord, NH | razed 1959 | |
| Conyers Passenger Station and Freight House | 1892 | Georgia Railroad Company | Conyers, GA | repurposed | |
| Cotton States and International Exposition | 1895 | City of Atlanta | Atlanta, GA | razed | |
| East Saginaw station | 1881 | Flint and Pere Marquette Railroad | Saginaw, MI | NRHP | |
| Edmund Coffin Jr. House | c. 1892 | Edmund Coffin Jr. | 57th St, New York, NY | | |
| Epworth Memorial Methodist Episcopal Church | 1890 | now Bushwick United Methodist Church | Brooklyn, NY | in use | |
| Essex-Fells Passenger Station | 1892 | Caldwell Railway | Essex Fells, NJ | relocated; residence | |
| Exhibition Building at World's Columbian Exposition | 1893 | New York Central & Hudson River Railroad; Wagner Palace Car Co. | Chicago, IL | razed | |
| Exhibition Building at Cotton States Exposition | 1895 | Atlantic Coast Line Railroad Co. | Atlanta, GA | razed | |
| Exhibition Building at Cotton States Exposition | 1895 | Southern Railway Company | Atlanta, GA | razed | |
| Fall River Passenger Station | 1891 | Old Colony Railroad | Fall River, MA | razed | |
| Fire Engine Company 258 / Hook & Ladder Company 115 | 1904 | Fire Department of the City of New York | Long Island City, NY | still in use | |
| Flatiron Building (English-American Building) | 1897 | English-American Loan and Trust Company | Atlanta, GA | NRHP | |
| Fort Washington Passenger Station | 1903 | Philadelphia and Reading Company | Fort Washington, PA | in use | |
| General Railroad Office Building | 1882 | Northern Pacific Railroad Company | Saint Paul, MN | razed | |
| Georgia Railroad Freight Depot | 1892 | Georgia Railroad Company | Augusta, GA | razed | |
| Georgia Railroad General Office Building | 1892 | Georgia Railroad Company | Augusta, GA | razed | |
| Grand Central Station | 1902 | New York Central and Hudson River Railroad | New York City, NY | razed | |
| Grand Rapids Passenger Train Shed | 1890 | Grand Rapids & Indiana Railroad | Grand Rapids, MI | moved | |
| Grovetown Passenger Station and Freight Depot | 1892 | Georgia Railroad Company | Grovetown, GA | razed 1973 | |
| Hartwood Post Office | 1899 | | Forestburgh, NY | | |
| Henry C. Potter Residence | 1890 | Dr. Henry C. Potter | East Saginaw, MI | razed | |
| Hoagland Laboratory (Long Island College Hospital) | 1888 | Dr. C. N. Hoagland | Brooklyn, New York City, NY | burned 1971 | |
| Illinois Central Depot & General Railroad Office | 1893 | Illinois Central Railroad | Chicago, IL | razed 1974 | |
| Intercolonial Station and Terminal | 1901 | Intercolonial Railroad | Halifax, Canada | exploded 1915 | |
| Hornellsville Railroad Shop | 1881 | New York, Lake Erie and Western Railroad | Hornellsville, NY | razed | |
| Jefferson Avenue Presbyterian Church | 1893 | | Detroit, MI | razed 1950s | |
| Kinston Passenger Station | 1905 | Atlantic and North Carolina Railroad | Kinston, NC | razed | |
| Laconia Passenger Station | 1892 | Concord & Montreal Railroad Co. | Laconia, NH | NRHP | |
| Lebanon Passenger Station | 1899 | Central Railroad of New Jersey | Lebanon, NJ | restored | |
| Liberty Station | 1893 | New York, Ontario and Western Railway Co. | Liberty, NY | razed | |
| LIRR Passenger Station and Baggage Claim | 1902 | Long Island Railroad | Southampton, NY | | |
| Manning Simmons House | 1902 | Dr. Manning Simons | 22 Rutledge Ave. Charleston, SC | residence | |
| Mary F. Ballentine Home for the Aged | 1895 | Thomas R. Ballentine | Norfolk, VA | | |
| Mason Stables (aka Dakota Stables) | 1881– 1894 | Edmund Coffin Jr | New York City, NY | razed 2007 | |
| Michigan Central Passenger Station & Baggage Building | 1892 | Michigan Central Railroad Co. | West Bay City, MI | razed | |
| Middlesex Street Union Station (Lowell Station) | 1893 | Boston & Maine Railroad | Lowell, MA | razed | |
| Middletown Passenger Station, Restaurant & Offices | 1893 | New York, Ontario & Western Railroad Co. | Middletown, NY | NRHP | |
| Monterey Stations and Offices | 1903 | Mexican National Railroad | Monterey, Mexico | | |
| New Boston Depot | 1893 | New Boston Rail Road | New Boston, NH | burned 1895 | |
| Newberry Memorial Chapel at Jefferson Ave. Church | 1889 | Mrs. John S. Newberry | Detroit, MI | razed 1950s | |
| North Abington station | 1894 | New York, New Haven & Hartford Railroad | North Abington, MA | NRHP | |
| North Branch station with Agent's Room | 1894 | Central Railroad of New Jersey | North Branch, NJ | burned 1970 | |
| Northern Pacific General Office Building | 1881 | Northern Pacific Railroad | Saint Paul, MN | razed | |
| Oyster Bay Passenger Station (renovations) | 1902 | Long Island Rail Road | Oyster Bay, NY | NRHP | |
| Parsons General Railroad Offices and Station | 1895 | Missouri, Kansas and Texas Railway | Parsons, KS | burned 1912 | |
| Pavonia Ferry Slips, Freight Sheds, and Piers | 1878– 1881 | New York, Lake Erie & Western Railroad | New York City, NY | | |
| Peninsular Club House | 1884 | Peninsular Club | Grand Rapids, MI | razed | |
| Philadelphia & Reading Company Passenger Station | 1902 | Philadelphia and Reading Company | Tioga, PA | | |
| Plainfield Twin Passenger Stations | 1902 | Central Railroad of New Jersey | Plainfield, NJ | NRHP | |
| Queretaro Station and Offices | 1901 | Mexican National Railroad | Queretaro, Mexico | | |
| Reed City Union Station | 1891 | Grand Rapids & Indiana Railroad | Reed City, MI | razed | |
| Riding Club | 1885–1886 | Riding Club | New York City, NY | razed | |
| Riding Club (renovation and expansion) | 1906 | Riding Club, James H. Woodward, president | New York City, NY | razed | |
| Roselle Twin Passenger Station | 1902 | Central Railroad of New Jersey | Roselle, NJ | razed | |
| St. Johns Episcopal Chapel | 1883 | | Sewaren, NJ | in use | |
| Samuel R. Smith Infirmary Main Bldg. & Hospital Ward | 1891 | Smith Infirmary | Tompkinsville, Staten Island, NY | razed 2012 | |
| Sedalia Station with Lunch Room & Railroad Offices | 1895 | Missouri-Kansas-Texas Railroad | Sedalia, MO | NRHP | |
| South Carolina Inter-State and West Indian Exposition | 1901 | Charleston Exposition Company | Charleston, SC | razed | |
| South Side Sportsmen's Club | 1866 | South Side Sportsmen's Club of Long Island | Great River, NY (Oakdale) | NRHP | |
| Southampton Passenger Station & Baggage Claim | 1902 | Long Island Rail Road | Southampton, NY | NPHP, in use | |
| Standish Farm | 1904 | William Henry Baldwin Jr. | Locust Valley, NY | | |
| Syracuse Passenger Station Offices & Train Shed | 1895 | New York Central & Hudson River Railroad | Syracuse, NY | razed | |
| Toluca Station | 1891 | Mexican National Railroad | Toluca, Mexico | | |
| Toms River Passenger Station | 1900 | Central Railroad of New Jersey | Toms River, NJ | razed | |
| Tower Building | 1889 | John Noble Stearns | New York City, NY | razed 1914 | |
| Trinity Methodist Church | 1903 | | Charleston, SC | razed | |
| Union Passenger Station | 1891 | Grand Rapids and Indiana Railroad; Flint and Pere Marquette Railroad | Reed City, MI | razed 1960s | |
| Union Passenger Station | 1880 | New York, Lake Erie & Western Railroad and Delaware & Hudson Canal Co. | Binghamton, NY | | |
| Union Station and Shed | 1898 | Concord & Montreal Railroad | Manchester, NH | razed | |
| Virginia Beach Hotel and Terminal Station | 1888 | Norfolk and Virginia Beach Railroad | Virginia Beach, VA | burned 1907 | |
| Water Street Mission | 1912 | Water Street Mission | New York City, NY | | |
| White House station | 1890 | Central Railroad of New Jersey | Whitehouse Station, NJ | NRHP | |
| William G. Raoul Residence | 1891 | William G. Raoul | Atlanta, GA | burned 1991 | |
| Woodward Avenue Depot | 1891 | Michigan Central Railway Company | Detroit, MI | | |
| YMCA Building | 1893 | New York, Ontario & Western Railroad Co. | Middletown, NY | | |
| YMCA Harlem Branch | 1886 | Young Men's Christian Association of NYC | Harlem, New York City, NY | razed | |
| Young Men's Institute (now YMCA) | 1883–1884 | Young Men's Christian Association of NYC | 222 Bowery, New York City, NY | NYC Landmark | |
