= Middletown station (New York, Ontario and Western Railway) =

Abandoned American railroad station

Middletown
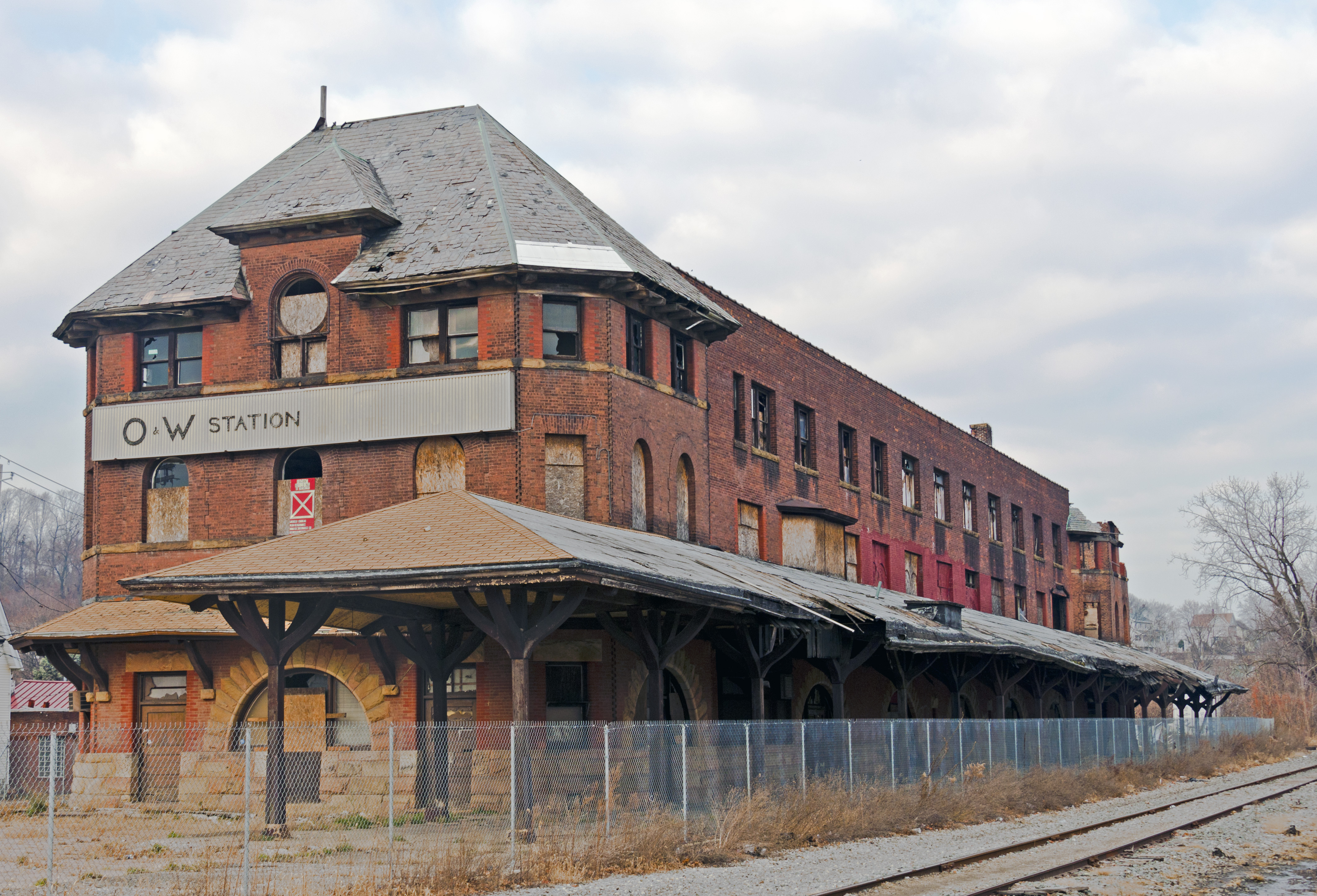
- Middletown station in December 2013.

General information
- Location: 2 Low Avenue, Middletown, Orange County, New York 10940

History
- Closed: March 29, 1957

Key dates
- February 2, 2004: Station depot caught fire

Former services
Preceding station	New York, Ontario and Western Railway	Following station
Winterton toward Oswego	Main Line	Crystal Run toward Weehawken
- New York, Ontario & Western Railway Company Middletown Station
- U.S. National Register of Historic Places
- Location within New York Location within the United States
- Location: 2 Low Ave., Middletown, New York
- Coordinates: 41°27′08″N 74°24′55″W
- Area: 1.06 acres (0.43 ha)
- Built: 1892-1893, 1904, 1915, 1920
- Architect: Gilbert, Bradford Lee; Canfield, David H.
- Architectural style: Richardsonian Romanesque
- NRHP reference No.: 14000129
- Added to NRHP: April 7, 2014
Location

New York, Ontario & Western Railway Company Middletown Station, also known as the O&W Station, is an historic train station located at Middletown in Orange County, New York. It was designed by Bradford Lee Gilbert and built in 1892-1893 by the New York, Ontario and Western Railway. It is a three-story Richardsonian Romanesque-style pressed brick and sandstone building. It measures approximately 237 feet (72 m) long and has towers at the north and south end. Additions and alterations were made to the original building in 1904 and 1920, designed by Middletown architect David H. Canfield. Also on the property is the contributing two-story records storage building, built in 1915. The station closed on September 10, 1953, on the cessation of O&W passenger service.

It was listed on the National Register of Historic Places in 2014, three years after the city, which owned it at the time, sold it for $1 to the Middletown Community Health Center (MCHC), which intended to redevelop it for its uses. But financial problems with the MCHC prevented it from raising the estimated $20 million cost of the project, despite winning some state grants. Those issues led to MCHC being bought-out by another health care organization; in 2017, it began negotiating to return it to the city. While Mayor Joe DeStefano says the city is open to offers, it is likely that the building will be demolished.
