= Laconia Passenger Station =

- U.S. National Register of Historic Places
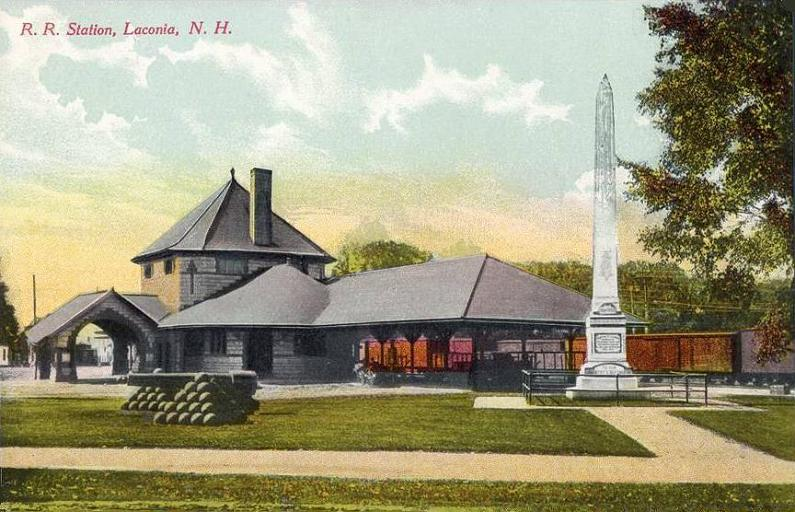
- Postcard of the station from c.1910

- Location within New Hampshire Location within the United States
- Location: 9-23 Veterans Sq., Laconia, New Hampshire
- Coordinates: 43°31′44.7″N 71°28′19.8″W
- Area: 1.1 acres (0.45 ha)
- Built: 1892
- Architect: Bradford Gilbert
- Architectural style: Romanesque, Richardsonian Romanesque
- NRHP reference No.: 82001667
- Added to NRHP: January 11, 1982

The Laconia Passenger Station is a historic railroad station at 9-23 Veterans Square in downtown Laconia, New Hampshire. It was built in 1892 for the Boston and Maine (B&M) Railroad and is a prominent regional example of Richardsonian Romanesque style architecture. It was added to the National Register of Historic Places in 1982. The building now houses a variety of commercial businesses.

== Description and history ==
The former Laconia Passenger Station is located on the north side of downtown Laconia, occupying an irregular block formed by North Main Street, Veterans Square, Pleasant Street, and New Salem Street. It is set at an angle to North Main Street, from which it is separated by the grassy area of Veterans Square, and faces roughly southeast. It is a long and roughly rectangular structure, with its northwest side facing where the tracks of the B&M formerly ran. It is built out of granite and red sandstone, and has a central area, the former waiting room, that is 2-1/2 stories in height, with a pyramidal roof. That area is flanked by single-story sections with tall hip roofs, and its front is dominated by a porte-cochère with large rounded arches. The waiting room area features a large sandstone fireplace, and has a floor covered in patterned tile.

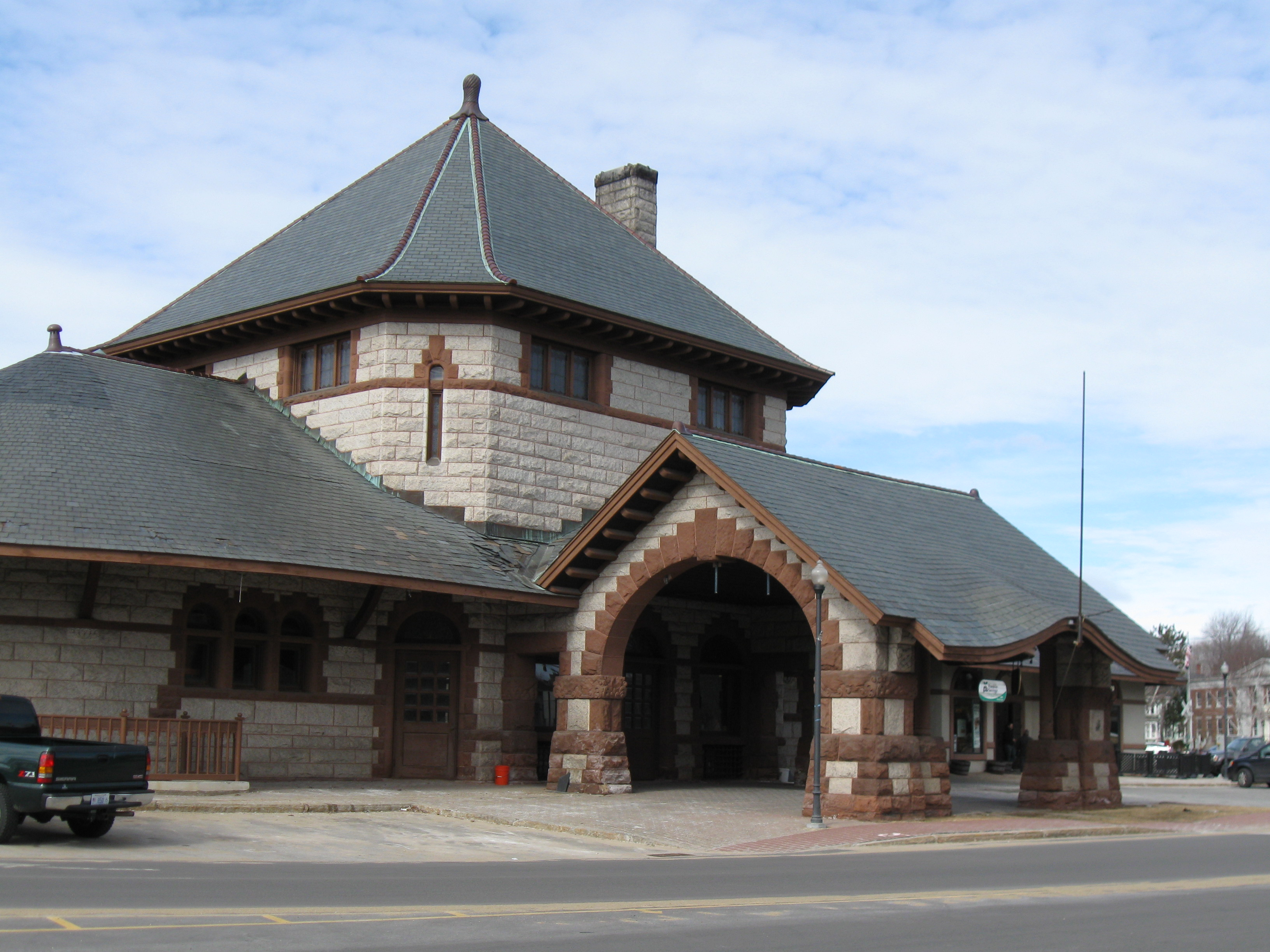
The former station in 2010

The station was built in 1892 to a design by New York City architect Bradford Gilbert. It was built for the Boston, Concord, and Montreal Railroad, which was acquired three years later by the Boston & Maine. The size and scale of the station were due in part to the activism of Charles Busiel, a local businessman who was later governor of New Hampshire. It is one of the only 19th-century stations of this scale and architectural sophistication to survive in the state.

The station served the railroad until 1965, with portions of it dedicated to local police and court functions as early as 1963. The building has since been repurposed for commercial uses.

== See also ==
- National Register of Historic Places listings in Belknap County, New Hampshire
