= Dundas Castle (Roscoe, New York) =

Historic house in Roscoe, New York, US

- U.S. National Register of Historic Places
- U.S. Historic district
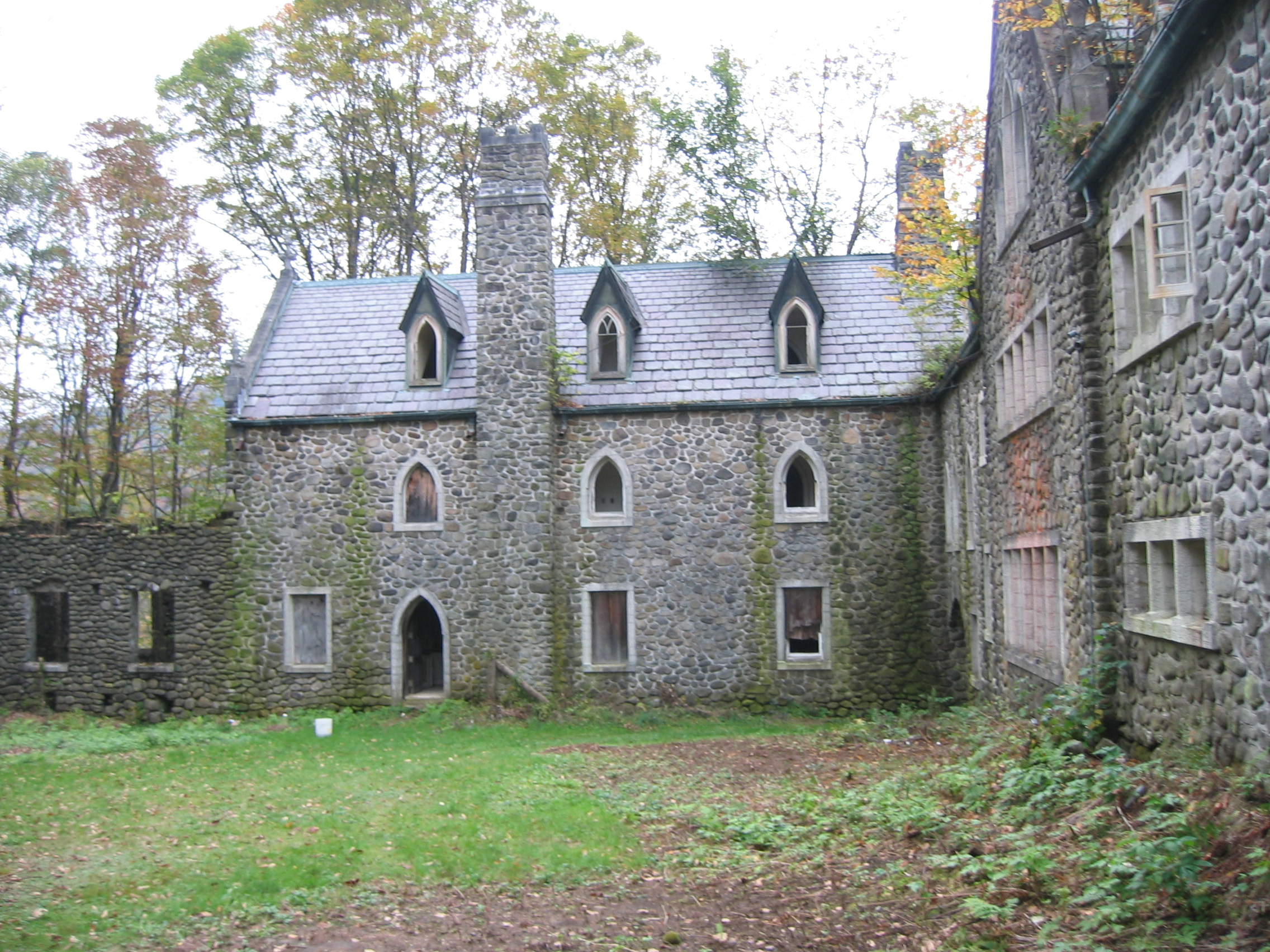

- Location within New York Location within the United States
- Location: 609 Craigie Clair Rd, Roscoe, NY 12776
- Coordinates: 41°58′4.0″N 74°51′53.2″W
- Area: 1,000 acres (400 ha)
- Built: 1910–24
- NRHP reference No.: 01000245
- Designated HD: 21 March 2001

Dundas Castle, also called Craig-e-Clair, is a neo-Gothic house near Roscoe in Sullivan County, New York. It was built between 1910 and 1924 for Ralph Wurts-Dundas.

== Early history ==
In the late 1880s, New York architect Bradford Gilbert acquired nearly 1,000 acres (400 ha) in the Catskill Mountains in what is now Roscoe, New York. On this property, Gilbert constructed his summer retreat, Beaverkill Lodge. Gilbert's new wife, Maria, who was Irish, said "the Catskill scenery reminded her of home." She named the surrounding hamlet Craig-e-Clair which she claimed translates as "beautiful mountainside."

== Wurts-Dundas era ==
In 1903, the Gilberts sold the property to Morris Stembach. Four years later, in 1907, Stembach sold it to Ralph Wurts-Dundas. Wurts-Dundas was a wealthy and prominent New Yorker, the grandson of William Wurts, one of three brothers who built the Delaware & Hudson Canal. He eventually shortened his name to Dundas.

Dundas wanted to expand the existing Beaverkill Lodge into the finest mansion his money could buy. Construction photographs show Beaverkill Lodge being "encapsulated within the castle structure." For his European-style castle, Dundas imported slate roofing from England, iron gates from France, and marble from Italy for floors, fireplaces, and staircases. The only local product used was stone from the nearby Beaverkill River. The reception room's fireplace was covered in gold leaf and valued at more than $5,000 in 1910.

Designed in the Gothic Revival and Elizabethan Revival styles, the 36-room residence was constructed between 1910 and 1924, but never completed or occupied by Dundas or his wife Josephine because he died in 1921. The castle was inherited by their daughter Muriel, along with some $40 million, but she did not go back to the Catskills and the castle.

== Masons and Camp Eureka ==
In 1949, Muriel sold the property for $47,000 to the Prince Hall Grand Lodge of the Masonic Order. This was a Manhattan-based organization of African-American Masons who wanted to create "a Masonic home for the aged and indigent." Unfortunately, that project did not happen, so the Masons developed the property into a vacation retreat, using a barn as a recreation center, an old farmhouse for administration, and the castle for a fishing and hunting resort. Over time, they added new structures and turned the property into a summer camp for inner-city youth. Named Camp Eureka, this is the main activity of the site today.

== Conservation ==
The building and property were added to the National Register of Historic Places in 2001. In 2005, the Masons entered into a conservation easement with Open Space Conservancy. The easement limits future development on the property and protects its historic structures.

== See also ==
- National Register of Historic Places listings in Sullivan County, New York
