= Tower Building (New York City) =

Former skyscraper in Manhattan, New York

Coordinates: 40.7067°N 74.0123°W

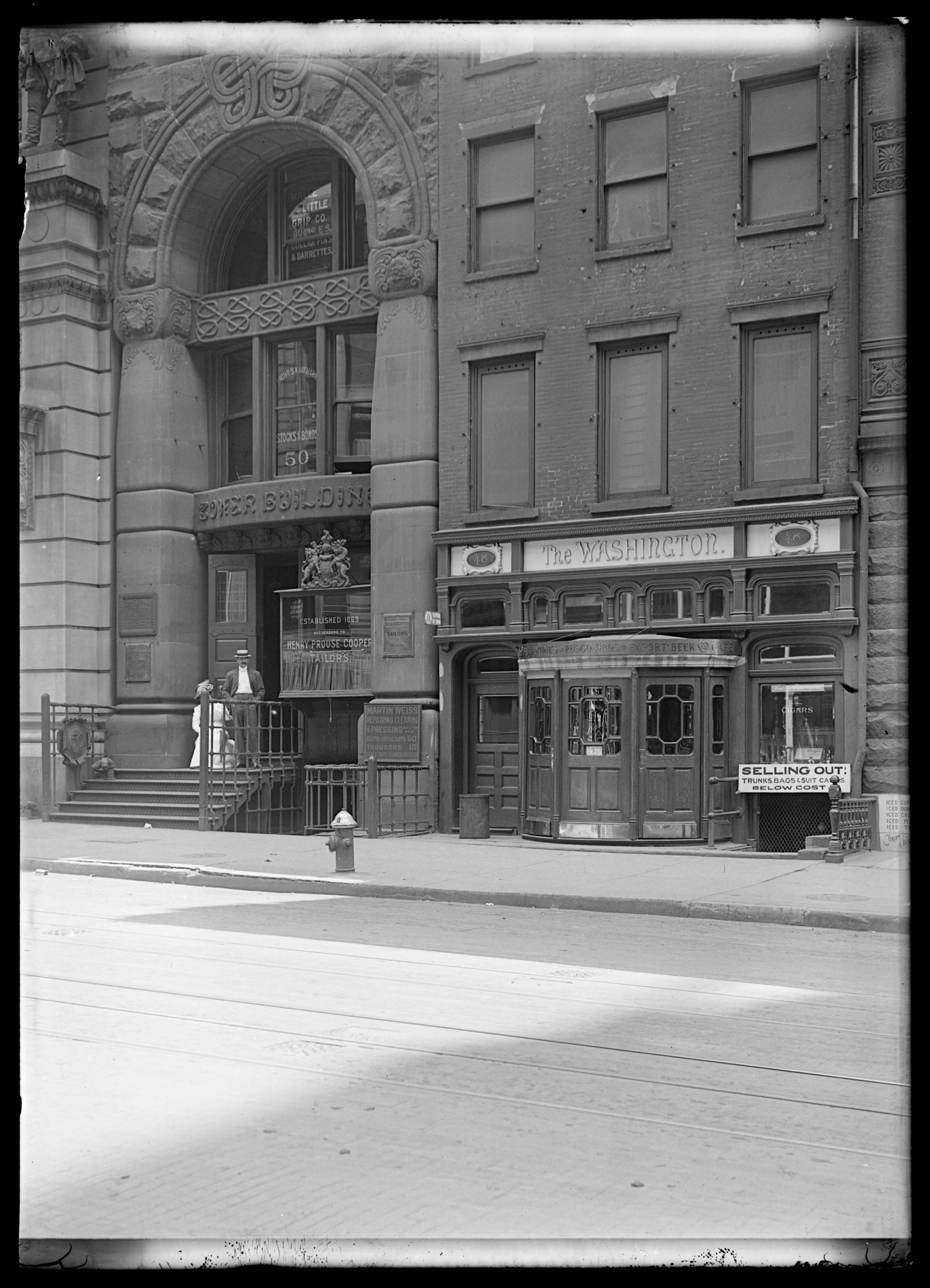
- Entrance to the Tower Building
- Interactive map of the Tower Building area

General information
- Architectural style: Gothic Revival architecture
- Location: Manhattan, New York City
- Construction started: 1888
- Completed: 1889
- Demolished: 1913

Design and construction
- Architect: Bradford Gilbert

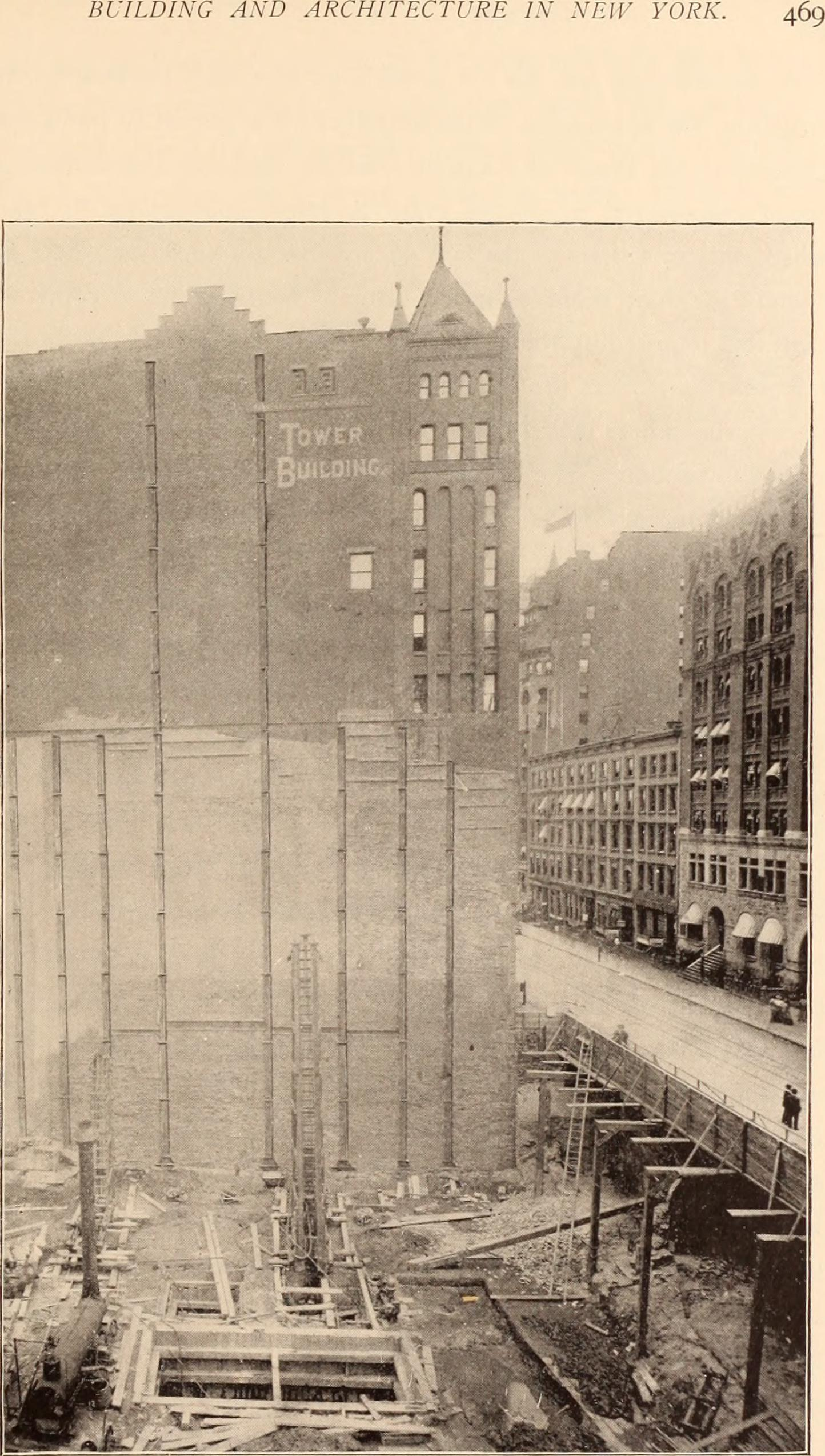
Shortly after completion

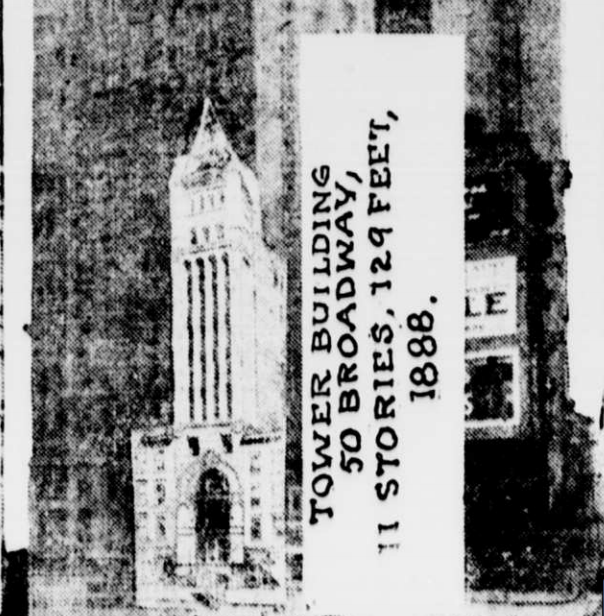
Shortly before demolition

The Tower Building was a structure in the Financial District of Manhattan, New York City, located at 50 Broadway on a lot that extended east to New Street. It was arguably New York City's first skyscraper, and the first building with a steel skeleton structure.

== History ==
Architect Bradford Gilbert filed plans for its construction on April 17, 1888, it was completed on September 27, 1889 and demolished beginning in 1913.

Though it was 108 ft (33 m) deep, the building had just 21.5 ft (6.6 m) of frontage on Broadway, necessitating its novel design. Chicago's Home Insurance Building (completed 1884) was the first to use structural steel, but that building did not fully support its masonry elements on the steel frame. On the narrow lot, a conventional design with load-bearing masonry walls would have left little room on the ground floor, but architect Gilbert asked, "Why can't I run my foundation far up in the air and then begin my building?" Gilbert's design came from a railroad bridge turned on its end. Cast iron columns about 20 feet (6.1 m) apart formed the skeleton, and the walls of each floor hung on a "shoe" instead of transmitting the load to the wall of the floor below. The resulting structure was 128 feet (39 m) in height, and 11 stories high. Gilbert made models to convince the city to permit the construction of his unusual design. It was quickly followed by taller steel-skeleton buildings, including the Columbia Building in 1890.

The Tower Building was sold by John N. Stearns in 1905, along with two adjacent buildings, for a reported price of about $1.5 million. In 1909, Morris Building Company, a holding company of Standard Oil Company, purchased it in foreclosure for $1.68 million. No longer profitable by 1913 due to its lack of tenants, it was vacated in December of that year and demolition began. Demolition was complete in 1914; at this point the tallest building in New York, the Woolworth Building, was 792 feet (241 m).
