= Flatiron Building (Atlanta) =

English-American Building
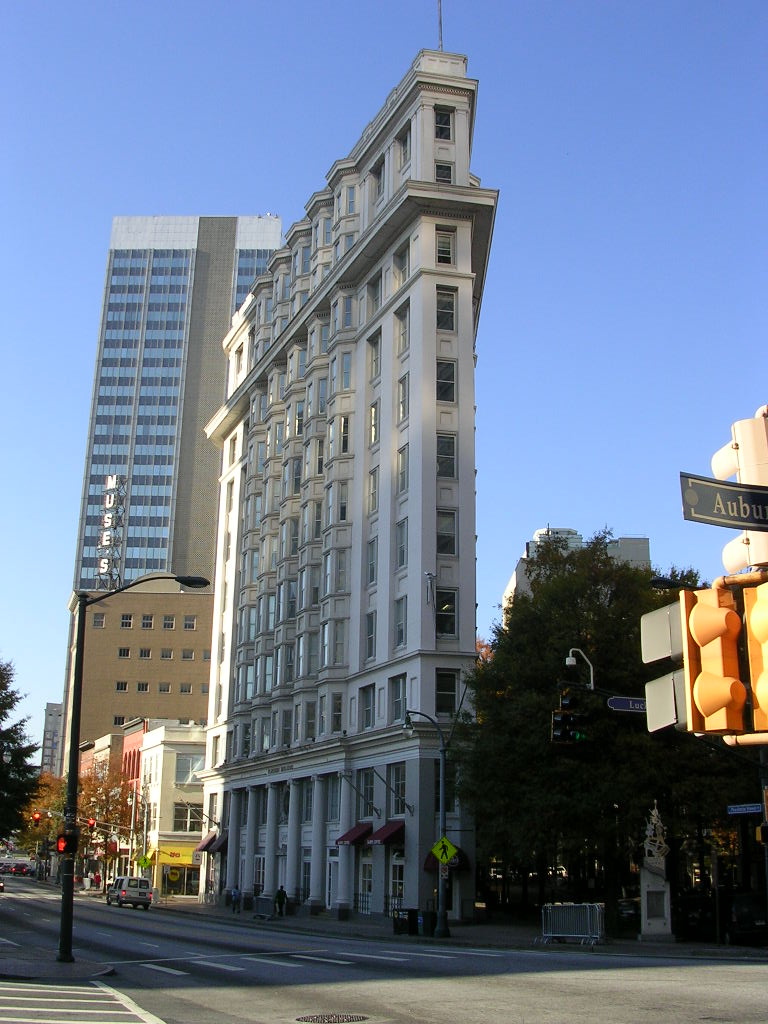
- Interactive map of the English-American Building area
- Alternative names: English-American Building; Flatiron Building; Georgia Savings Bank Building; Empire Life Insurance Building

General information
- Type: Commercial offices
- Location: 84 Peachtree Street NW; Atlanta, Georgia
- Coordinates: 33.7562°N 84.3885°W
- Completed: 1897

Height
- Roof: c. 50 m (160 ft)

Technical details
- Floor count: 11

Design and construction
- Architect: Bradford Gilbert
- English-American Building
- U.S. National Register of Historic Places
- U.S. Historic district – Contributing property
- Atlanta Landmark Building
- Architectural style: Neo-Classical; Neo-Renaissance
- Part of: Fairlie–Poplar Historic District (ID82002416)
- NRHP reference No.: 76000626

Significant dates
- Designated NRHP: March 26, 1976
- Designated CP: September 9, 1982
- Designated ALB: December 23, 1991

The English-American Building, commonly referenced as the Flatiron Building, is a building completed in 1897 located at 84 Peachtree Street NW in downtown Atlanta, Georgia, on the wedge-shaped block between Peachtree Street NE, Poplar Street NW, and Broad Street NW. It was completed five years before New York's Flatiron Building, and shares a similar prominent flatiron shape as its counterpart. It was designed by Bradford Gilbert, a Chicago school contemporary of Daniel Burnham, the designer of the New York building. The building has 11 stories, and is the city's second and oldest standing skyscraper. The Flatiron building is protected by the city as a historic building in the Fairlie-Poplar district of downtown, and is listed in the National Register of Historic Places.

Immediately across Peachtree is the historic Rhodes-Haverty Building, on the north corner with Williams Street.

FlatironCity is now home to a Microsoft Innovation Center, Women's Entrepreneurship Institute and 20+ entrepreneurs and startups.

In 2017, it was announced that a statue of Evander Holyfield would be installed in front of the building. However, the planned location for the statue has since been changed.

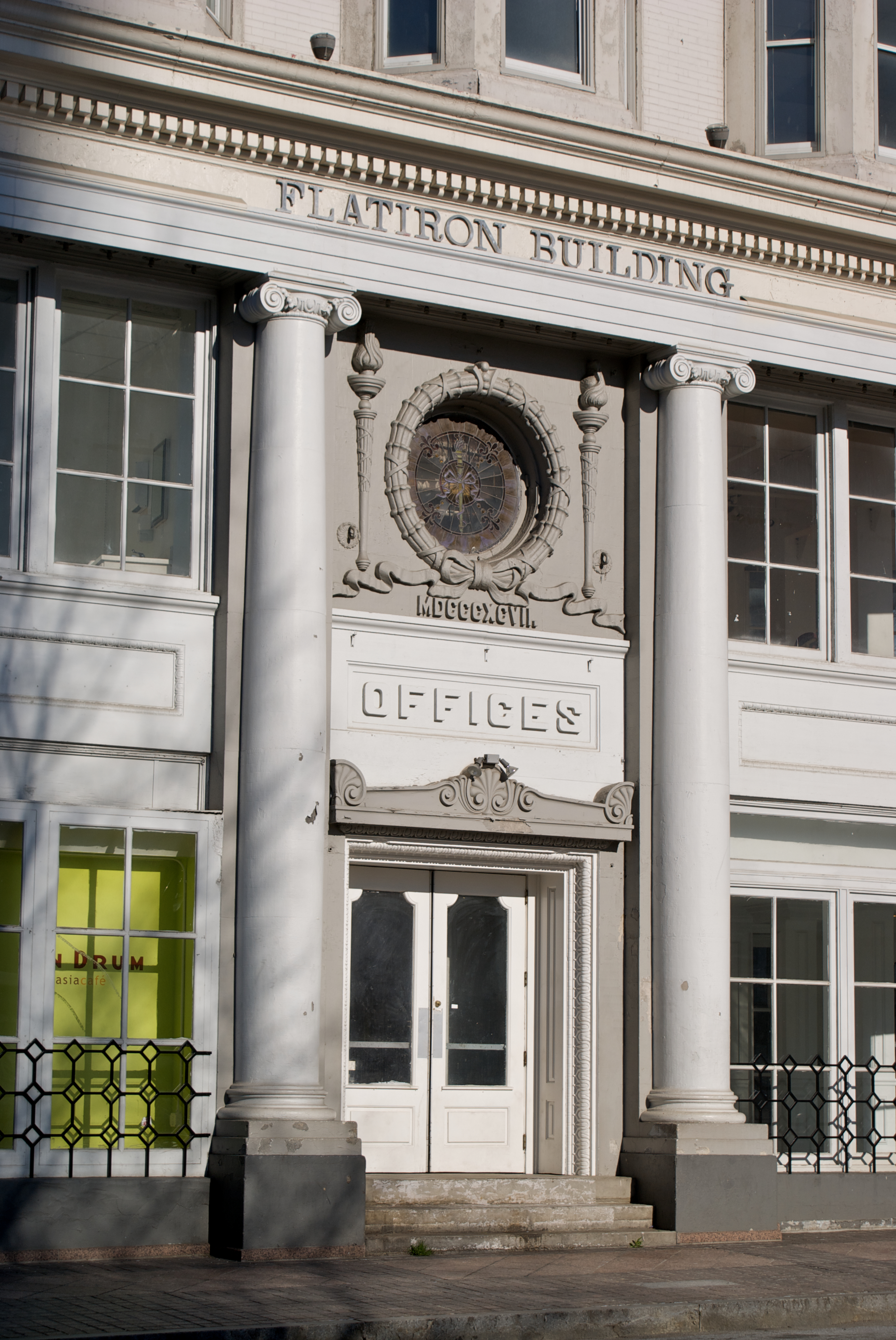
Peachtree Street entrance

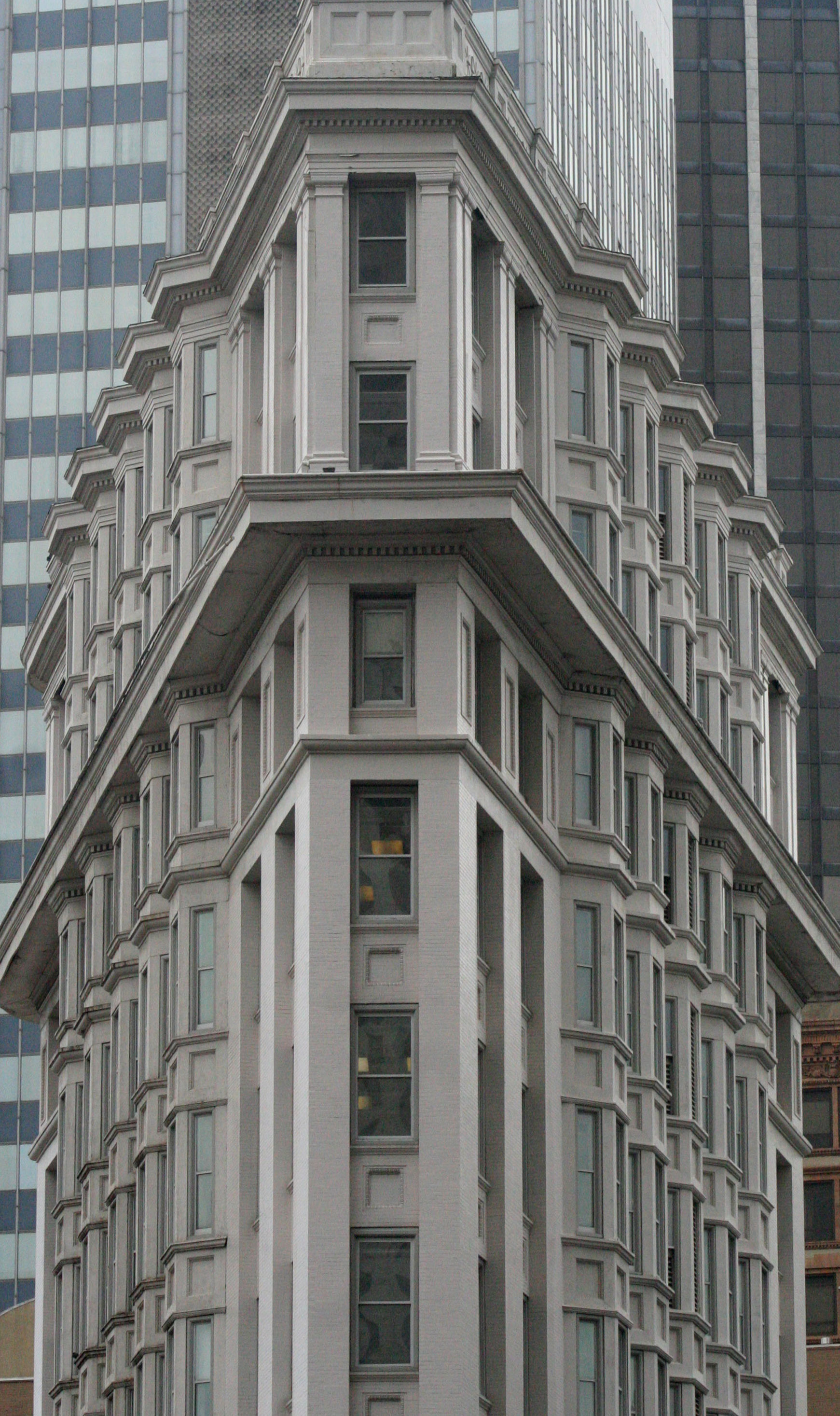

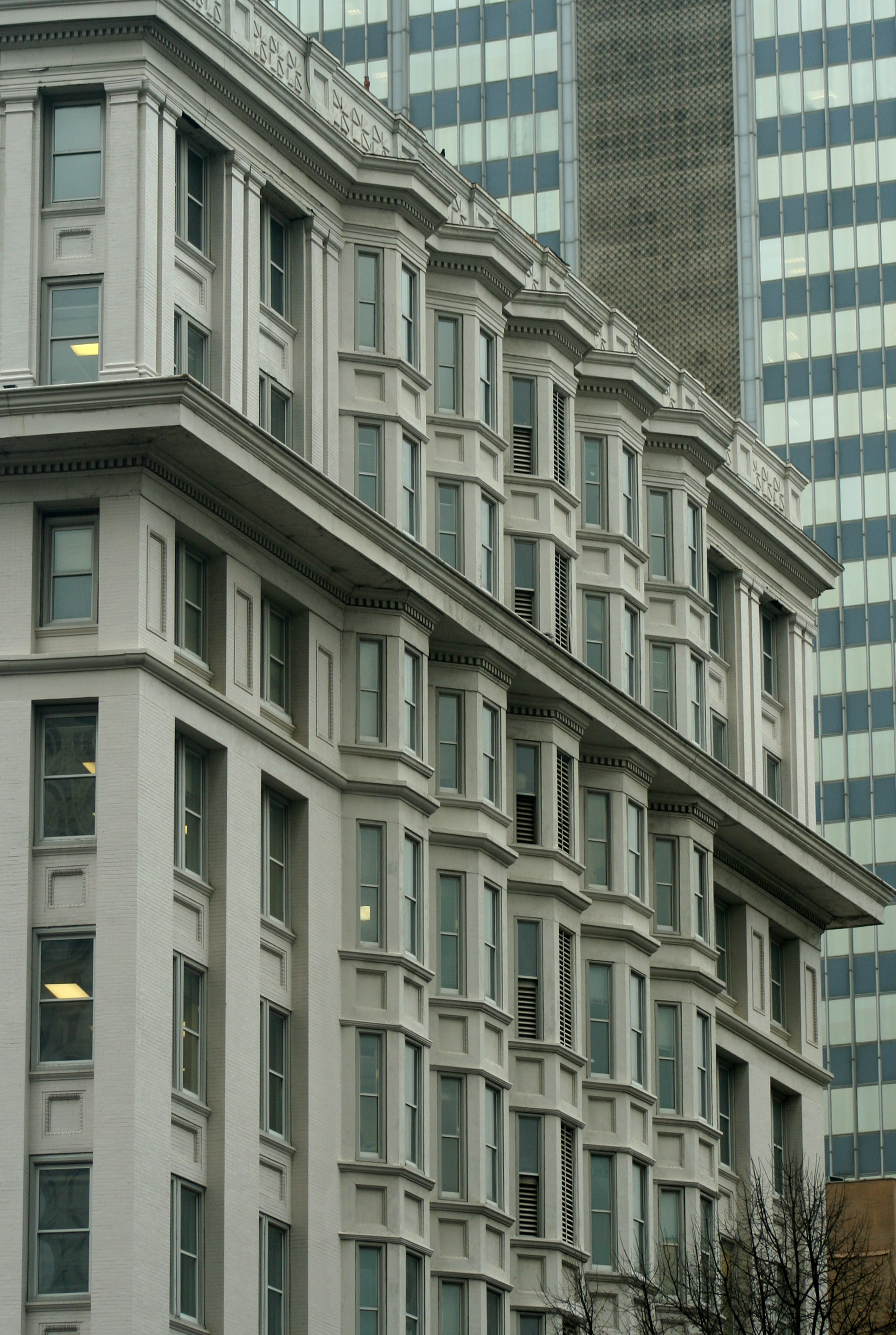

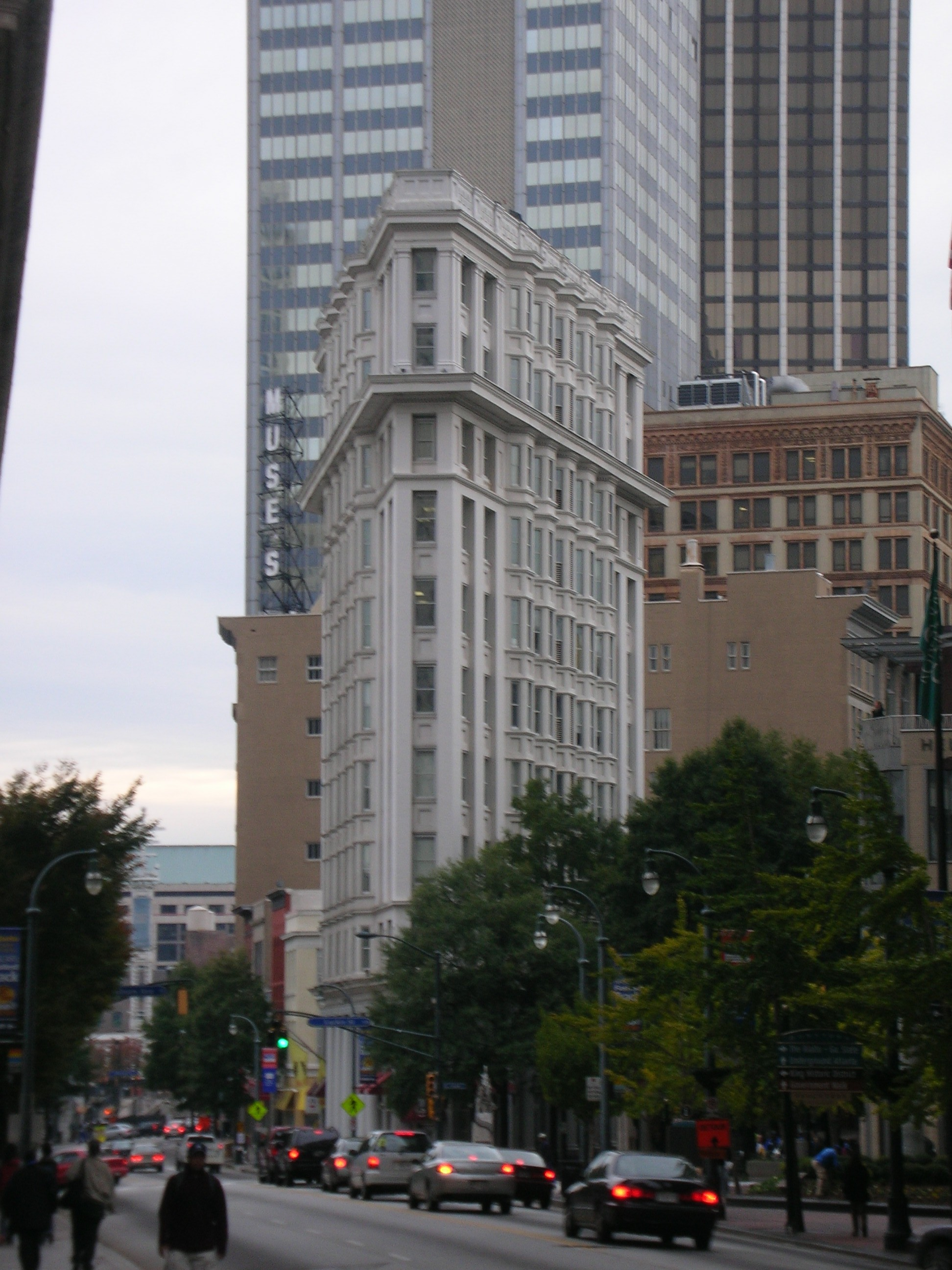
