= Atlantic Coast Line Railroad Commercial and Industrial Historic District =

Historic district in Virginia, United States

- U.S. National Register of Historic Places
- U.S. Historic district
- Virginia Landmarks Register
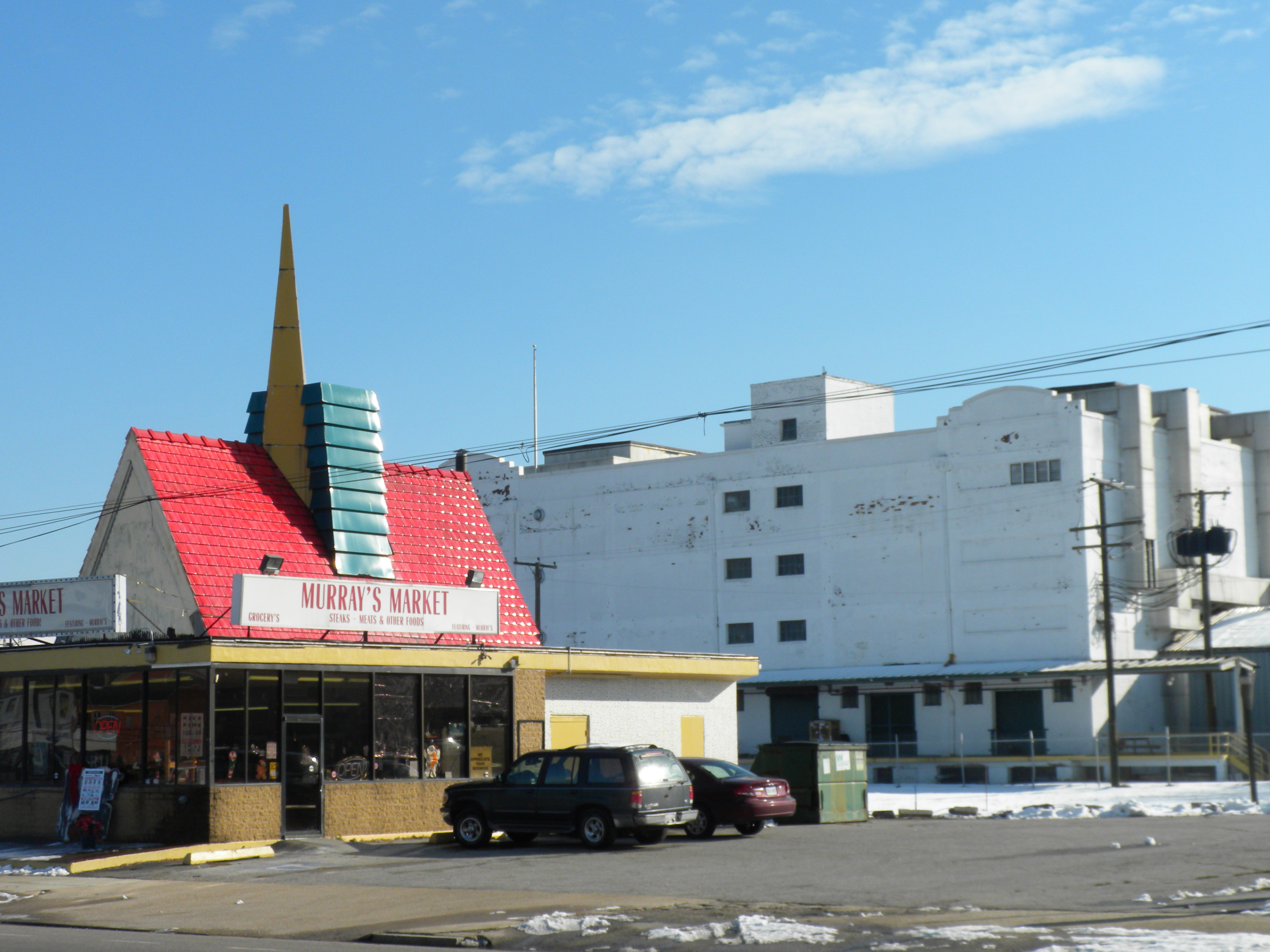
- Industrial District along Washington Street, December 2009

- Location within Virginia Location within the United States
- Location: 200-300 W. Washington, 4-42 S. Market, 100-100 Perry, 200-300 block W. Wythe, 200 block Brown Sts., Petersburg, Virginia
- Coordinates: 37°13′34″N 77°24′28″W
- Area: 24 acres (9.7 ha)
- Built: 1879
- Architectural style: Art Deco, Commercial
- NRHP reference No.: 09000665
- VLR No.: 123-5424

Significant dates
- Added to NRHP: August 27, 2009
- Designated VLR: June 18, 2009

Atlantic Coast Line Railroad Commercial and Industrial Historic District is a national historic district located at Petersburg, Virginia. The district includes 15 contributing buildings, 1 contributing structure, and 1 contributing object located in a predominantly industrial and commercial section of Petersburg. The section housed some of Petersburg's important industries – tobacco and wholesale grocery and confectioner. Notable buildings include the Cameron Building (c. 1879), Export Leaf Tobacco Company (1913), H.P. Harrison Company (1912), Brown & Williamson complex, and Gibson Drive-in.

It was listed on the National Register of Historic Places in 2009.
