= Maya Hayuk =

American artist

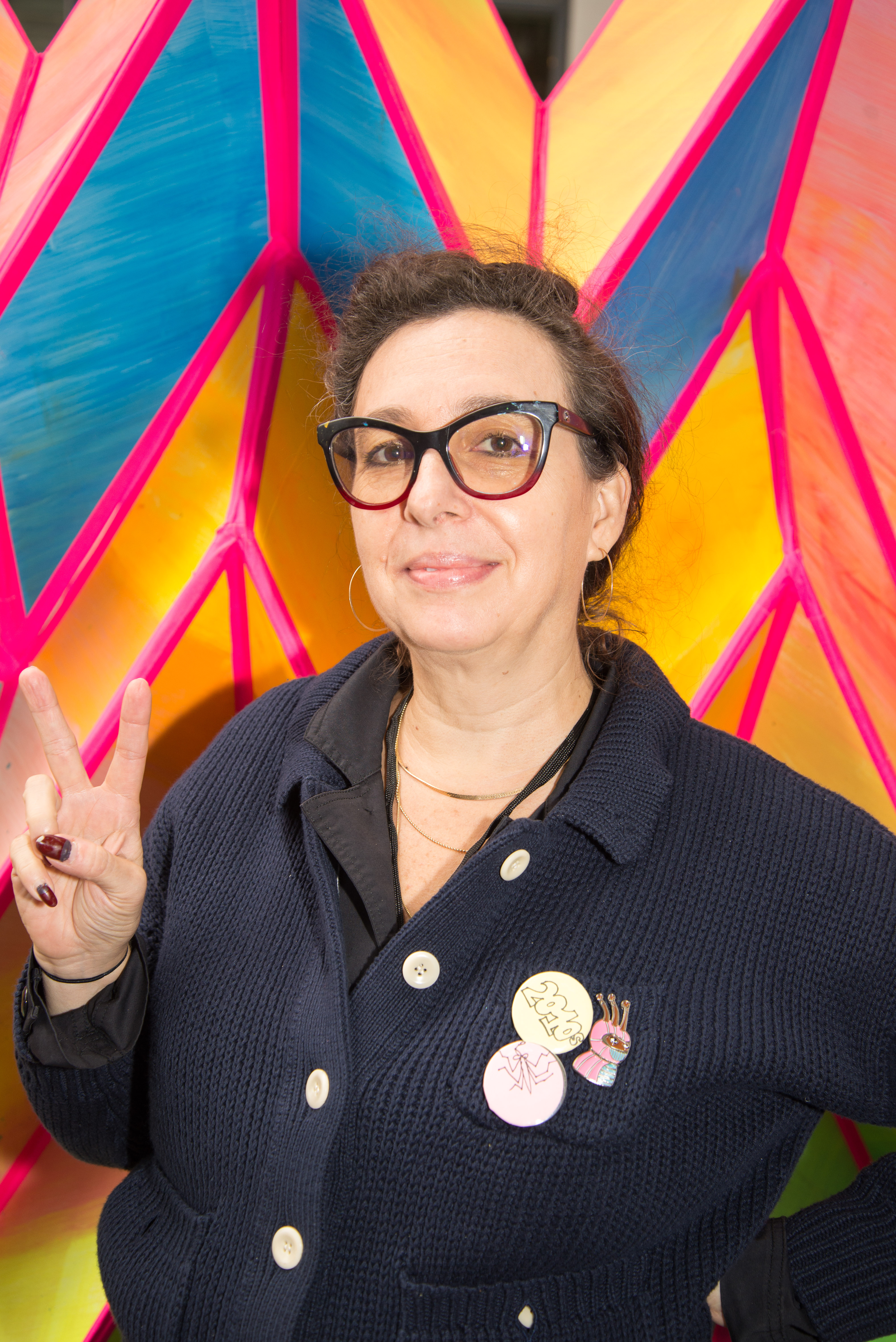
- Artist Maya Hayuk at Black Lunch Table x Skowhegan Block Party 2021.
- Born: 1969 (age 55–56); Baltimore, Maryland, U.S.
- Education: University of Odesa, Skowhegan School of Painting and Sculpture
- Alma mater: Massachusetts College of Art and Design
- Known for: Geometric, patterned murals

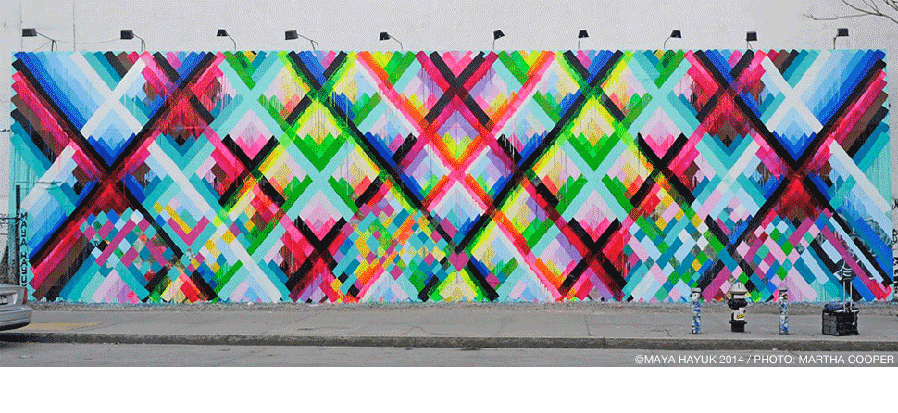
Wall painting, "Chem Trails NYC", Houston & Bowery, February 2014

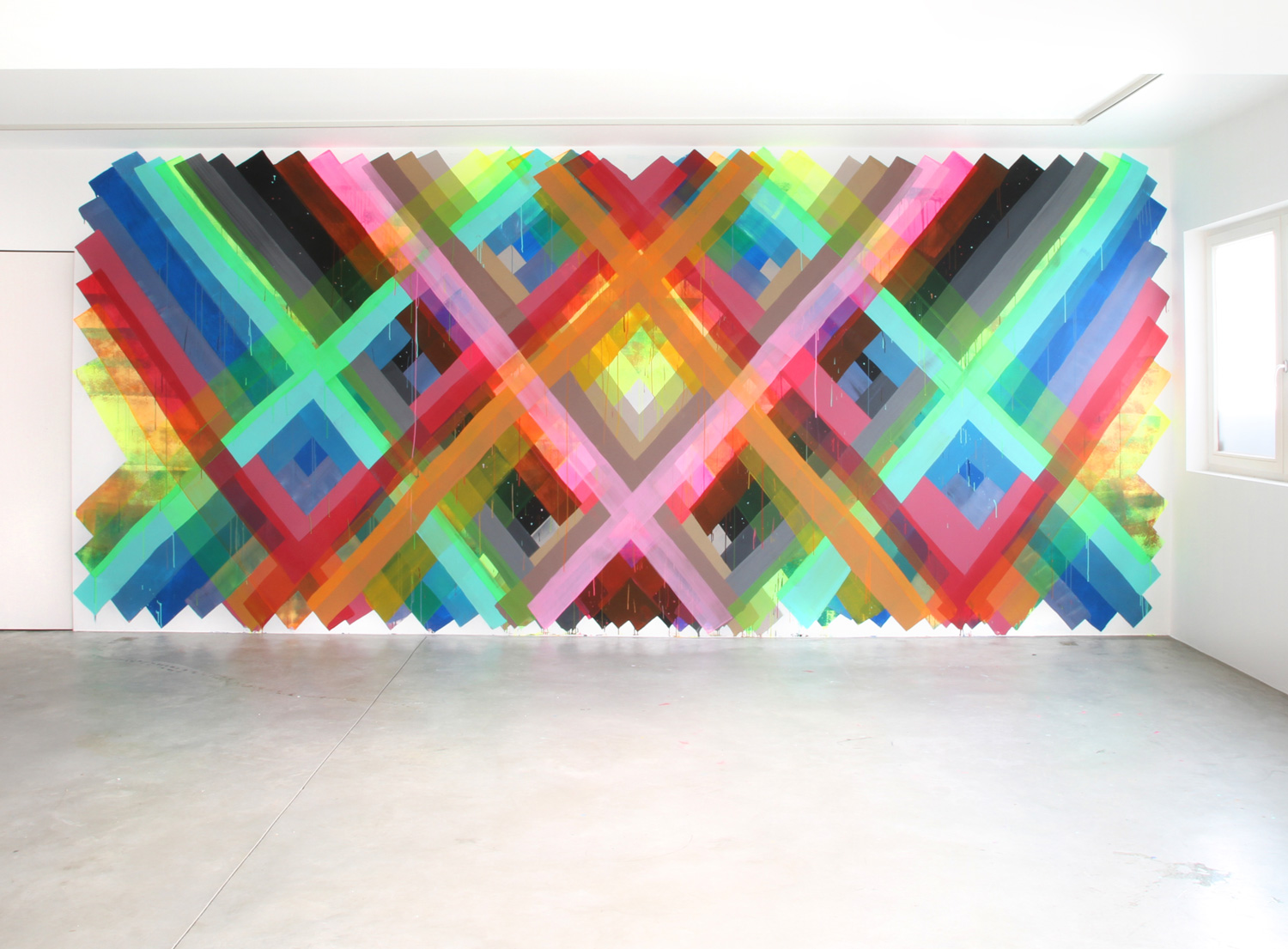
Head Light, exhibition view at ALICE Gallery, Brussels

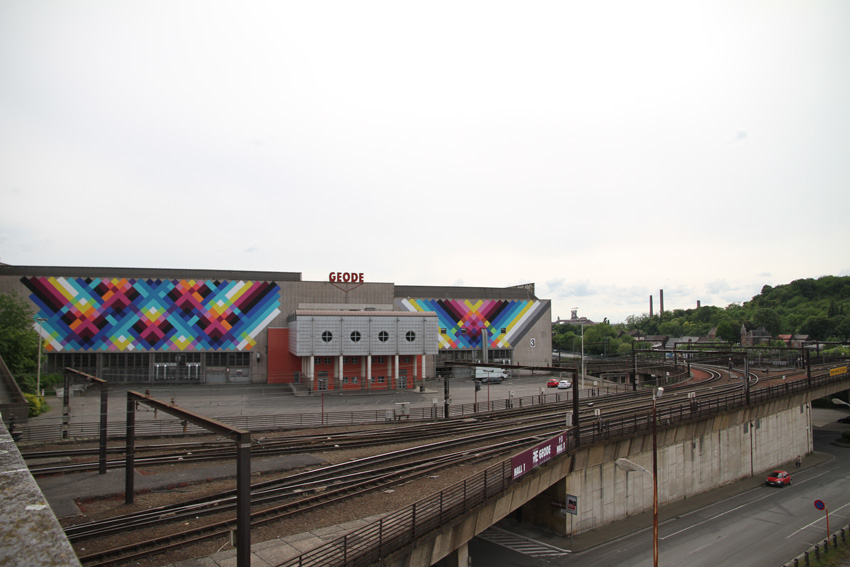
Mural painting in Charleroi, 2014

Maya Hayuk (born 1969 in Baltimore, Maryland) is an internationally exhibited American artist living and working in Brooklyn, New York. She is best known for the bold geometric patterns she employs in large-scale murals.

== Biography ==
Hayuk received a BFA in 1991 from Massachusetts College of Art and Design, she has also studied at the University of Odesa, in Odesa, Ukraine and at Skowhegan School of Painting and Sculpture.

She gathers her inspiration from pysanka, mandalas, chandeliers, views from the Hubble Telescope, holograms, Rorschach tests, and the surrounding environment.

Her work has been the subject of solo exhibitions and commissions at venues including UCLA's Hammer Museum, LA (2013), The Museum Of Contemporary Canadian Art, Toronto (2013), Bonnefanten Museum, Maastricht (2012) and Socrates Sculpture Park in New York (2011).

In 2005, she curated and produced This Wall Could Be Your Life on the exterior walls of Monster Island, which is now demolished. It was a self-funded 7-year project. On September 11, 2011, she arranged the Paint Pour Off, an event in which paint was poured from the rooftop and down the walls of the building to mark the finality of this project and Monster Island.

From August 17, 2013 until January 6, 2014, her work was the subject of a museum exhibition at UCLA's Hammer Museum called “Hammer Projects: Maya Hayuk”. She painted large-scale murals in the lobby of the Hammer Museum, in which the project was opened with an August 16, 2014, event with artists Chris Johanson and Gary Panter and music from the band No Age.

During the winter of 2014, she created a new work for the Bowery Mural, an ever-changing series of installed murals on a wall project established by the late real estate developer and art impresario Tony Goldman. She is only the third woman to paint this wall.

Hayuk has curated numerous exhibitions, such as Apocabliss at ALICE Gallery (2008). She is a member of the Barnstormers collective, the Cinders Art Collective and has frequently collaborated with other artists and musicians.

She has created album covers, videos, stage sets, photographs and posters for Rye Rye/M.I.A, Akron/Family, TV on the Radio, The Flaming Lips, Devendra Banhart, Seun Kuti, Prefuse 73, Awesome Color, Oakley Hall, Home, Animal Collective, Dan Deacon, Bonnie Prince Billy and the Beastie Boys, among others.

== Legal issues ==
Hayuk's work has been the center of disputes over appropriation. In 2015, Hayuk sued Starbucks, claiming that the company used her designs after she had declined the company's offer to partner with them. The lawsuit was thrown out, but in 2016, Hayuk asked the judge on the case to reconsider the decision. The works in question are copyrighted, but the court decided that shapes, lines and colors were not exclusive to Hayuk and withstood copyright infringement's substantial similarities.

Hayuk has also sued singer Sara Bareilles and Coach for featuring her New York mural Chemical Trails without the artist's permission.
