= The Houston Bowery Wall =

Mural wall in New York City

Coordinates: 40°43′28″N 73°59′34.5″W

The Houston Bowery Wall, also known simply as the Bowery Wall, is a mural wall owned by Goldman Properties in the East Village and NoHo neighborhoods of Manhattan in New York City. The concrete wall, on Houston St and the intersection of the Bowery, had been a popular graffiti spot in the early 1980s, when street artist Keith Haring created a large mural on it in 1982. The wall was acquired by Goldman Properties in 1984. Tony Goldman began using the wall for advertisements, though they were regularly vandalized. The wall once again became an art spot in 2008, when Goldman gave curator Jeffrey Deitch the right to commission large murals for the wall, with new pieces added every 6–12 months.

Since 2008, several street artists have had their works showcased on this famous wall, including: Shepard Fairey, FAILE, Os Gêmeos, Logan Hicks, Kenny Scharf, Aiko Nakagawa, Ron English, TATS CRU, David Flores and his partner Olivia Bevilacqua, and many others. The site is often reviewed as a significant part of the New York City art world.

Many artists and institutions have used this famous spot to draw attention to global issues, such as a 2018 installation by JR in collaboration with Time magazine about guns in America, a 2018 piece by Banksy highlighting the imprisonment of an artist by the Turkish government, and a celebration of global culture in 2019 by Tomokazu Matsuyma.

In May 2022, the owners of the wall announced an indefinite break from new murals on the wall, due to increased vandalism, but a new mural by Tomokazu Matsuyama appeared the following year.
