= Bowery =

Street and neighborhood in Manhattan, New York

The Bowery
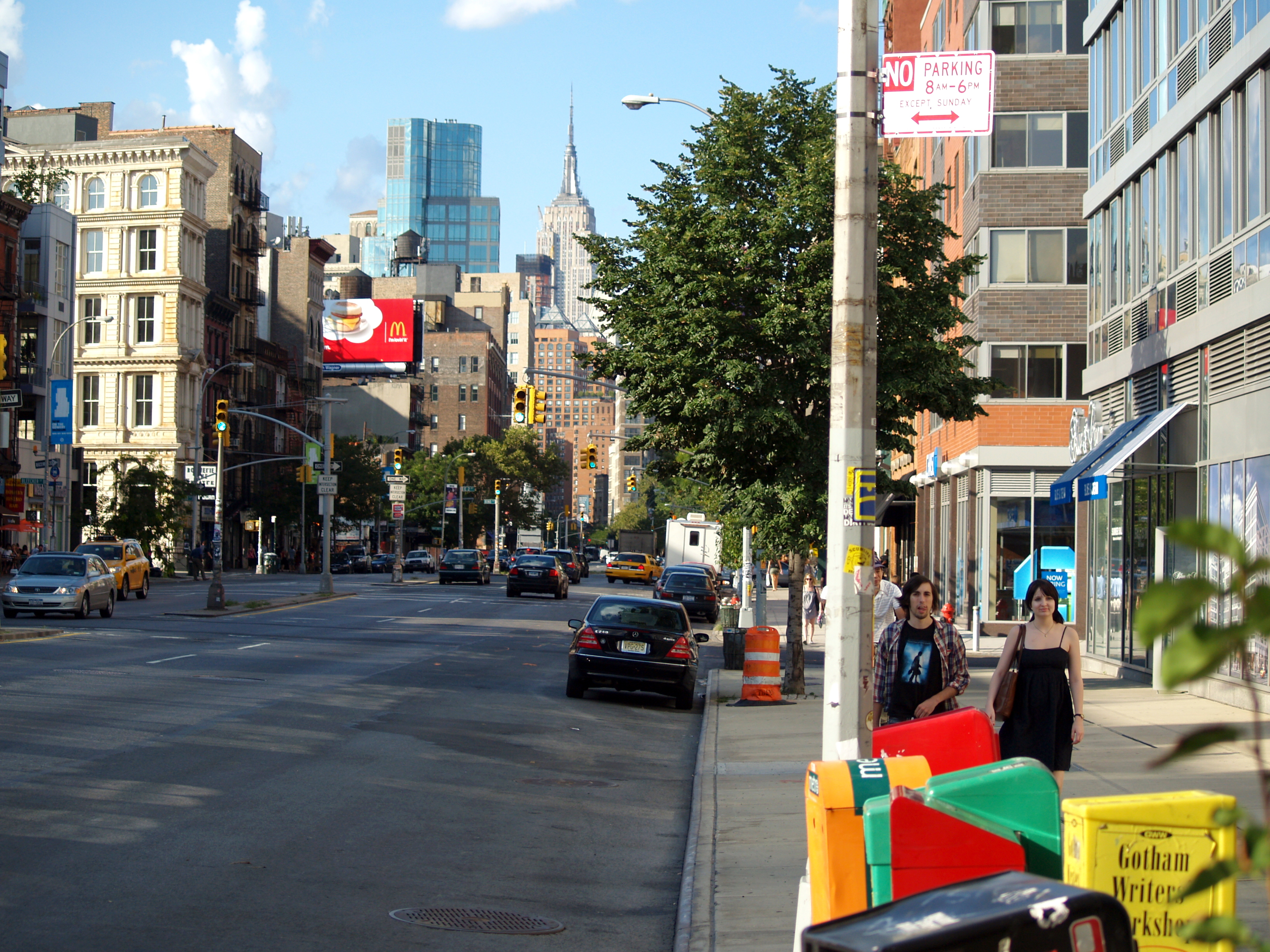
- Looking north from Houston Street
- Interactive map of The Bowery
- Former name: Bowery Lane (prior to 1807)
- Length: 1.6 km (0.99 mi)
- South end: Chatham Square
- North end: East 4th Street (continues as Cooper Square)

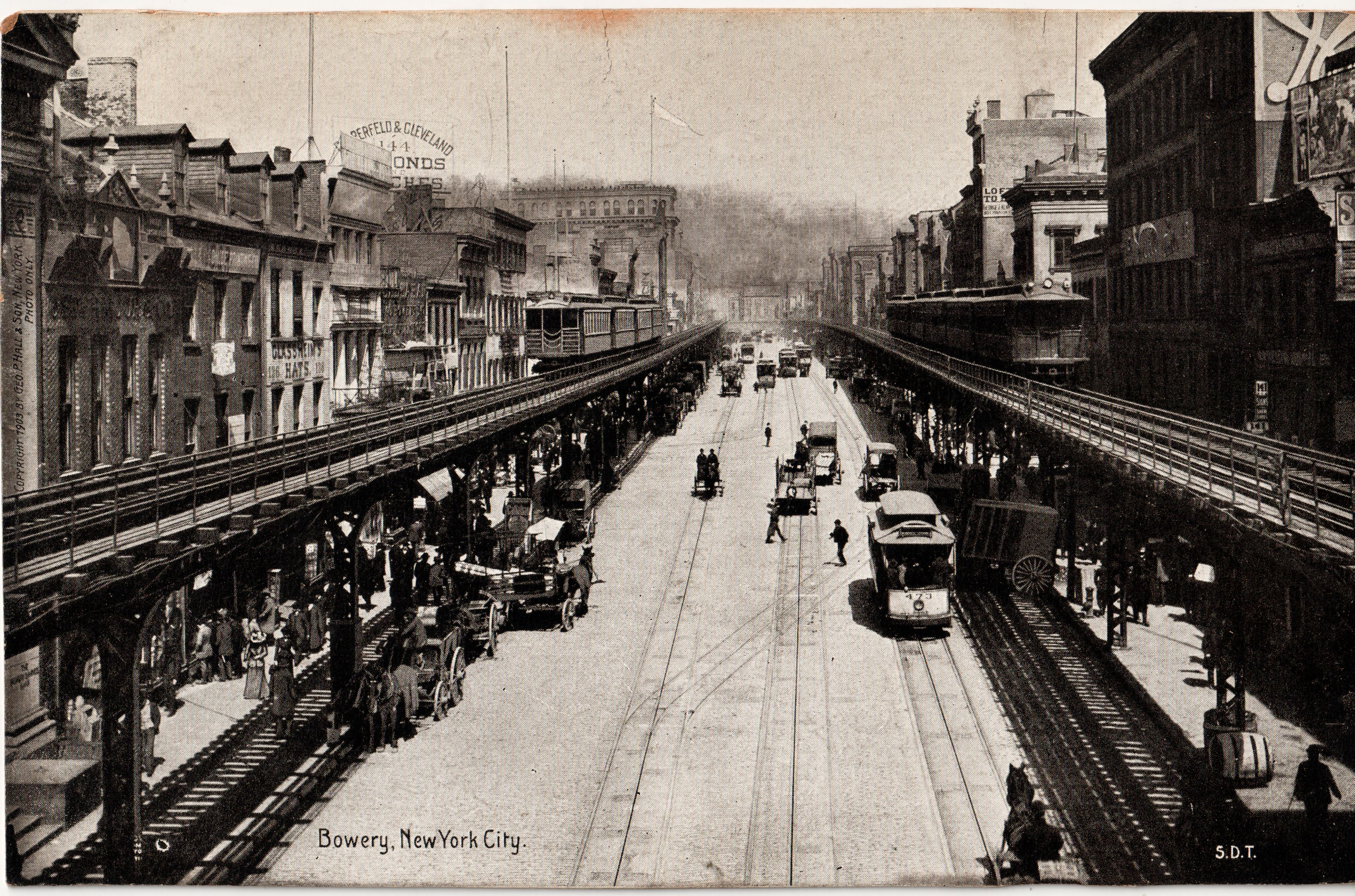
Bowery circa 1900s, showing the tracks of the Third Avenue Elevated

The Bowery (/ˈbaʊəri/) is a street and neighborhood in Lower Manhattan in New York City, New York. The street runs from Chatham Square at Park Row, Worth Street, and Mott Street in the south to Cooper Square at 4th Street in the north. The eponymous neighborhood runs roughly from the Bowery east to Allen Street and First Avenue, and from Canal Street north to Cooper Square/East Fourth Street. The neighborhood roughly overlaps with Little Australia. To the south is Chinatown, to the east are the Lower East Side and the East Village, and to the west are Little Italy and NoHo. It has historically been considered a part of the Lower East Side of Manhattan.

In the 17th century, the road branched off Broadway north of Fort Amsterdam at the tip of Manhattan to the homestead of Peter Stuyvesant, director-general of New Netherland. The street was known as Bowery Lane prior to 1807. "Bowery" is an anglicization of the Dutch bouwerie, derived from an antiquated Dutch word for "farm": In the 17th century the area contained many large farms.

The New York City Subway's Bowery station, serving the BMT Nassau Street Line (J and Z trains), is located close to the Bowery's intersection with Delancey and Kenmare Streets. There is a tunnel under the Bowery at Confucius Plaza, intended for use by a never-completed portion of the Second Avenue Subway. The M103 bus runs on the entire Bowery.

== History ==
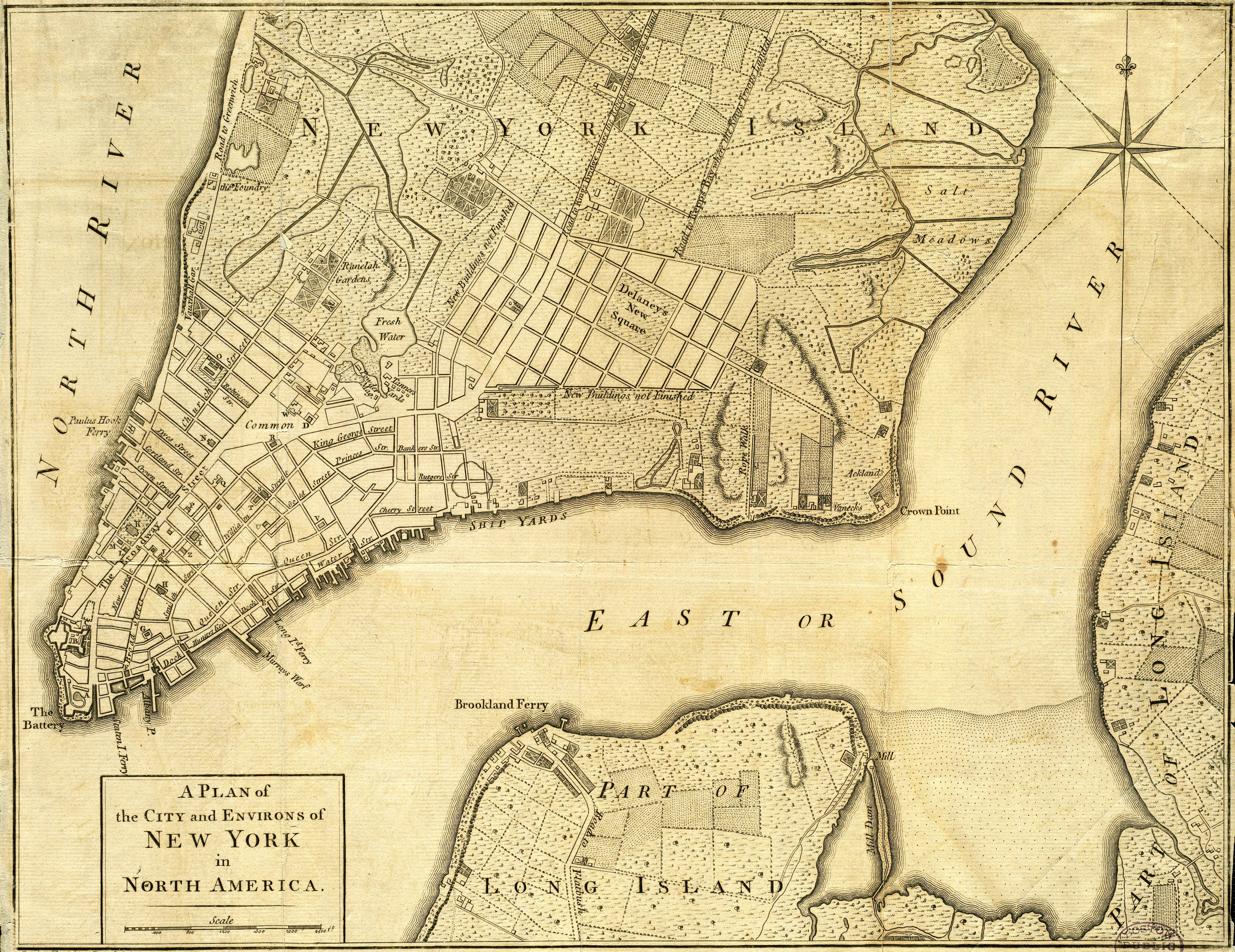
The Bowery (unmarked), leading to the "Road to Kings Bridge, where the Rebels mean to make a Stand" in a British map of 1776

=== Colonial and Federal periods ===
The Bowery is the oldest thoroughfare on Manhattan Island, preceding European intervention as a Lenape footpath, which spanned roughly the entire length of the island, from north to south. When the Dutch settled Manhattan island, they named the path Bouwerie road – "bouwerie" (or later "bouwerij") being an old Dutch word for "farm" – because it connected farmlands and estates on the outskirts to the heart of the city in today's Wall Street/Battery Park area.

In 1654, the Bowery's colonial residents settled in the area of Chatham Square; ten freedmen and their wives set up cabins and a cattle farm there. Petrus Stuyvesant, the last Dutch governor of New Amsterdam before the English took control, retired to his Bowery farm in 1667. After his death in 1672, he was buried in his private chapel. His mansion burned down in 1778 and his great-grandson sold the remaining chapel and graveyard, now the site of the Episcopal church of St. Mark's Church in-the-Bowery.

In her Journal of 1704–05, Sarah Kemble Knight describes the Bowery as a leisure destination for residents of New York City in December:

Their Diversions in the Winter is Riding Sleys about three or four Miles out of Town, where they have Houses of entertainment at a place called Bowery, and some go to friends Houses who handsomely treat them. [...] I believe we mett 50 or 60 slays that day – they fly with great swiftness and some are so furious that they'le turn out of the path for none except a Loaden Cart. Nor do they spare for any diversion the place affords, and sociable to a degree, they'r Tables being as free to their Naybours as to themselves.

By 1766, when John Montresor made his detailed plan of New York, "Bowry Lane", which took a more north-tending track at the rope walk, was lined for the first few streets with buildings that formed a solid frontage, with market gardens behind them; when Lorenzo Da Ponte, the librettist for Mozart's Don Giovanni, The Marriage of Figaro, and Così fan tutte, immigrated to New York City in 1806, he briefly ran one of the shops along the Bowery, a fruit and vegetable store. In 1766, straight lanes led away at right angles to gentlemen's seats, mostly well back from the dusty "Road to Albany and Boston", as it was labeled on Montresor's map; Nicholas Bayard's was planted as an avenue of trees. James Delancey's grand house, flanked by matching outbuildings, stood behind a forecourt facing Bowery Lane; behind it was his parterre garden, ending in an exedra, clearly delineated on the map.

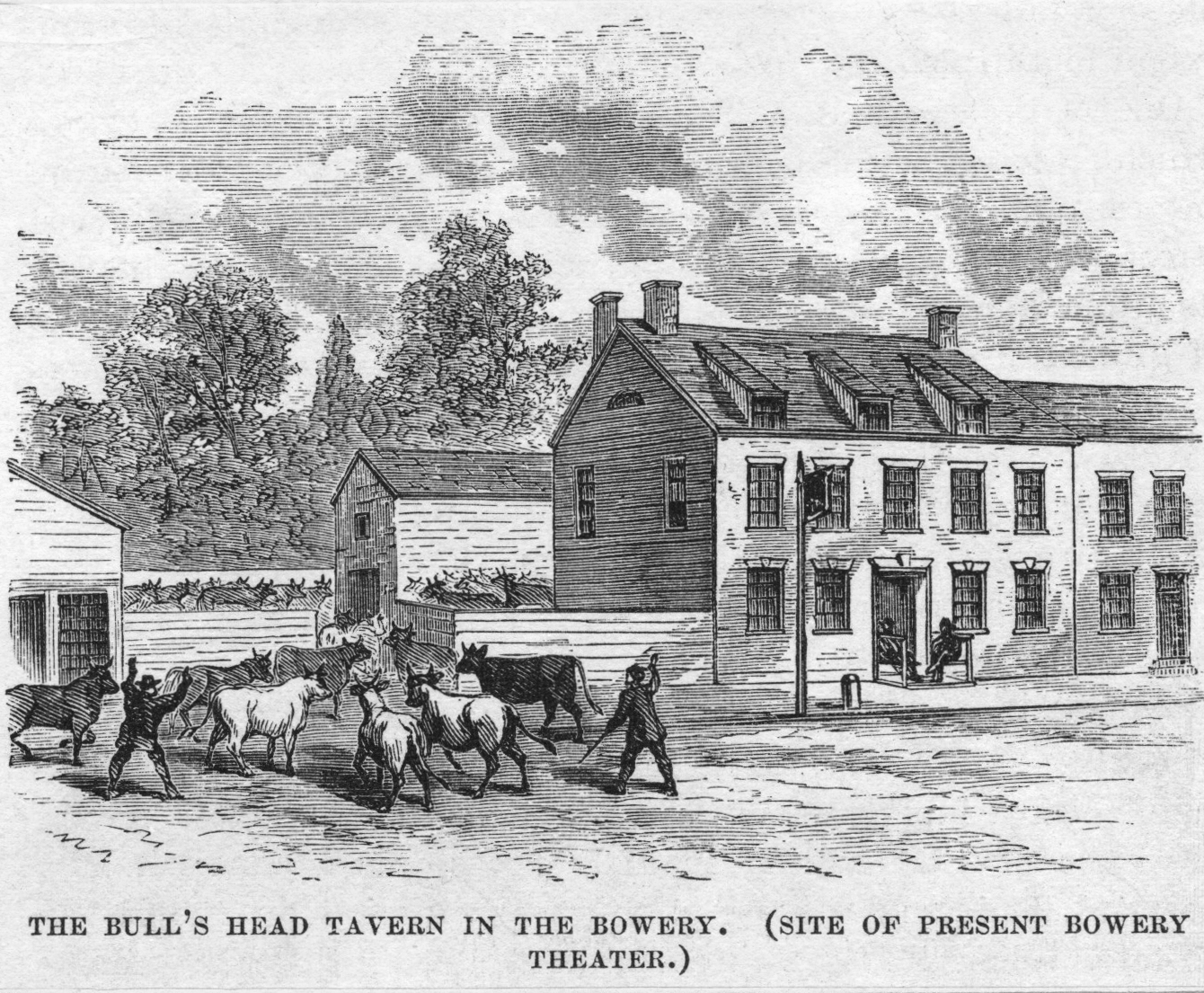
The Bull's Head Tavern in the Bowery, 1801 – c. 1860

The Bull's Head Tavern was noted for George Washington's having stopped there for refreshment before riding down to the waterfront to witness the departure of British troops in 1783. Leading to the Post Road, the main route to Boston, the Bowery rivaled Broadway as a thoroughfare; as late as 1869, when it had gained the "reputation of cheap trade, without being disreputable" it was still "the second principal street of the city".

=== Early growth ===
As the population of New York City continued to grow, its northern boundary continued to shift northward, and by the early 1800s the Bowery was no longer a farming area outside the city. The street gained in respectability and elegance, becoming a broad boulevard, as well-heeled and famous people moved their residences there, including Peter Cooper, the industrialist and philanthropist. The Bowery began to rival Fifth Avenue as an address.

When Lafayette Street was opened parallel to the Bowery in the 1820s, the Bowery Theatre was founded by prominent families on the site of the Red Bull Tavern, which had been purchased by Andrew Morris and John Jacob Astor; it opened in 1826 and was the largest auditorium in North America at the time. Across the way the Bowery Amphitheatre was erected in 1833, specializing in the more populist entertainments of equestrian shows and circuses. From stylish beginnings, the tone of Bowery Theatre's offerings matched the slide in the social scale of the Bowery itself.

=== Economic decline ===
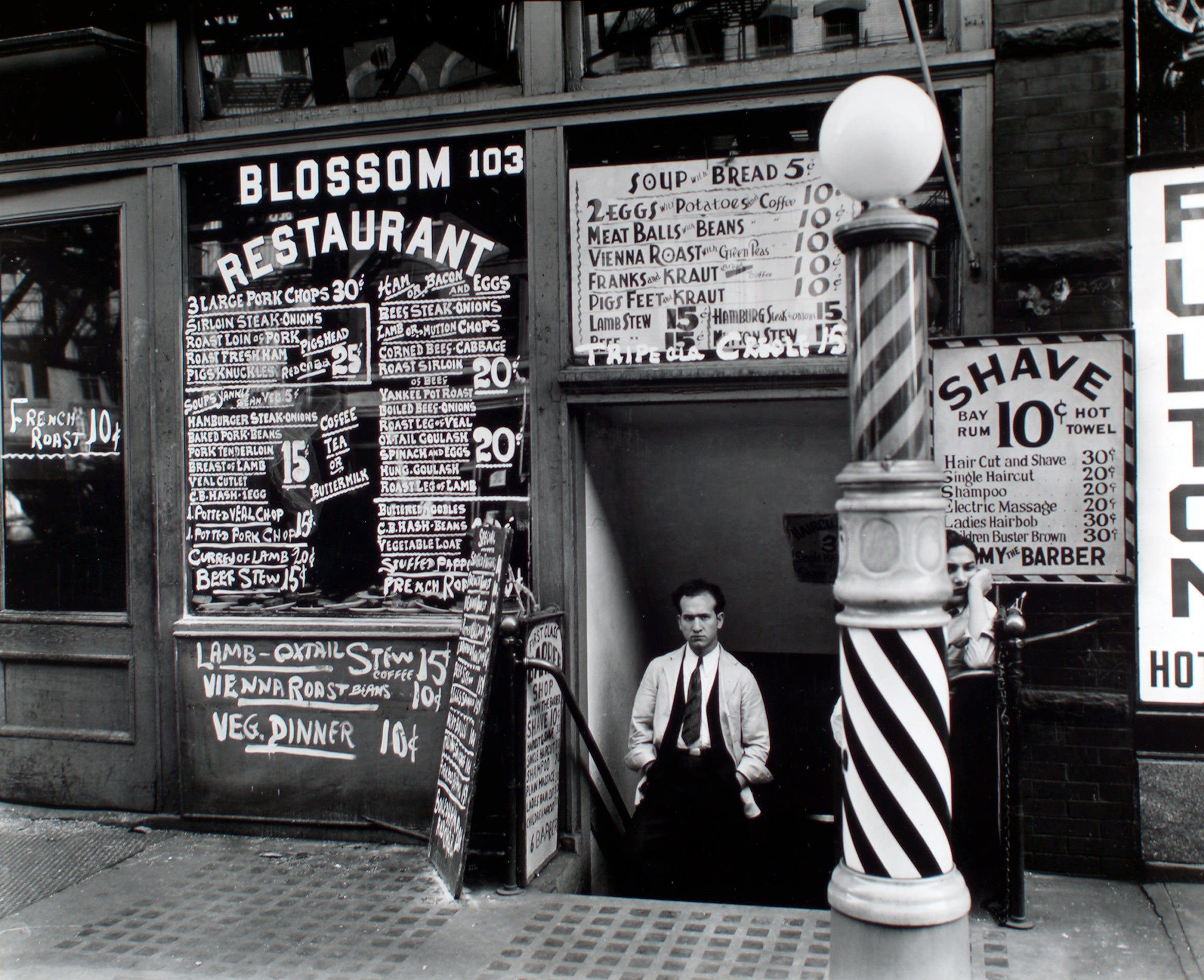
Berenice Abbott photograph of a Bowery restaurant in 1935, when the street was lined with flophouses

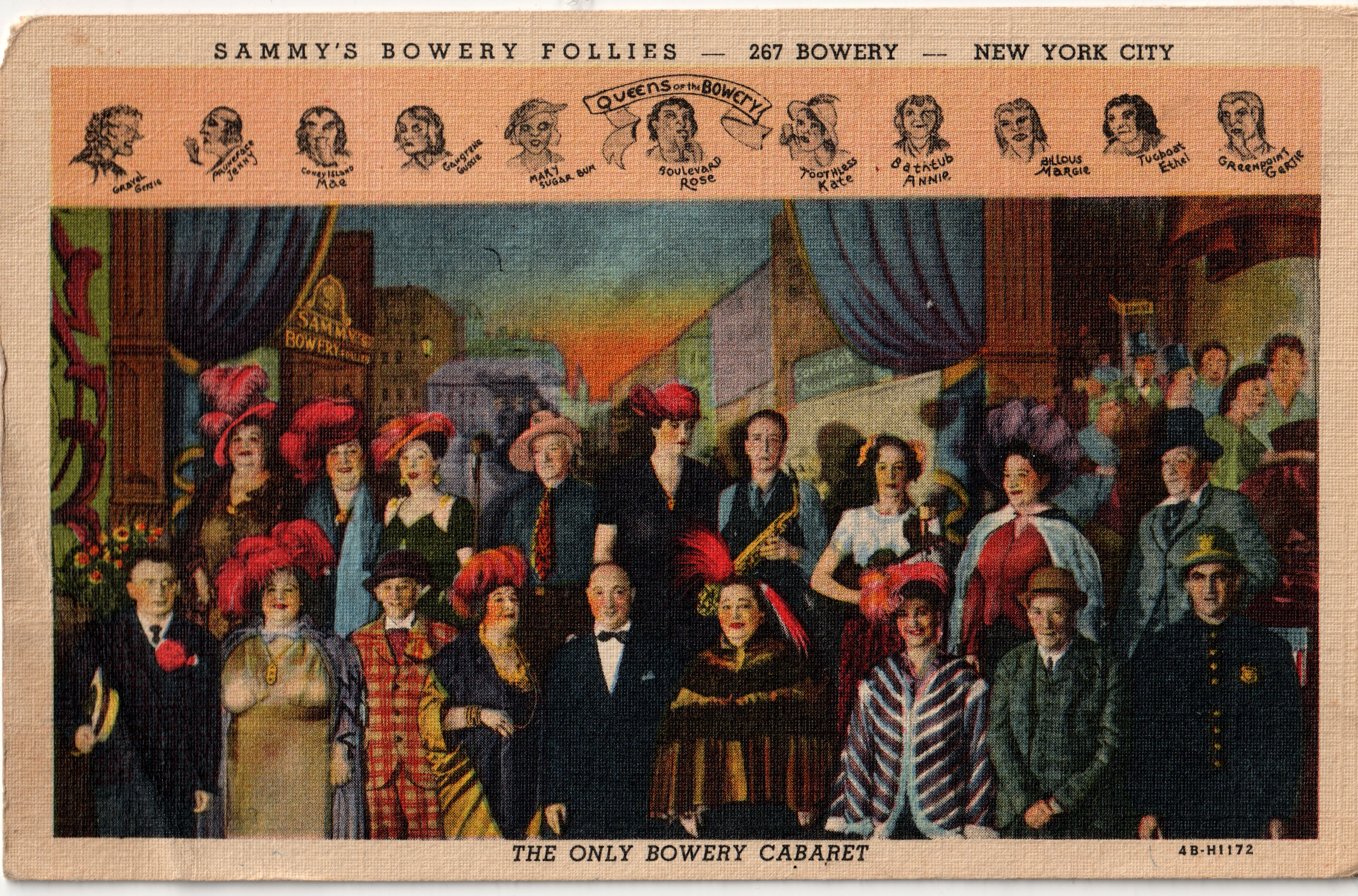
Sammy's Bowery Follies - "The Only Bowery Cabaret" - promotional card, circa 1940s

By the time of the Civil War, the mansions and shops had given way to popular music halls, brothels, beer gardens, pawn shops, and flophouses, like the one at No. 15 where the composer Stephen Foster lived in 1864. Theodore Dreiser closed his tragedy Sister Carrie, set in the 1890s, with the suicide of one of the main characters in a Bowery flophouse. The Bowery, which marked the eastern border of the slum of "Five Points", had also become the turf of one of America's earliest street gangs, the nativist Bowery Boys. In the spirit of social reform, the first YMCA opened on the Bowery in 1873; another notable religious and social welfare institution established during this period was the Bowery Mission, founded in 1880 at 36 Bowery by Reverend Albert Gleason Ruliffson. The mission has remained along the Bowery throughout its lifetime. In 1909 the mission moved to its current location at 227–229 Bowery.

By the 1890s, the Bowery was a center for prostitution that rivaled the Tenderloin, also in Manhattan, and for bars catering to gay men and some lesbians at various social levels, from The Slide at 157 Bleecker Street, New York's "worst dive", to Columbia Hall at 5th Street, called Paresis Hall. One investigator in 1899 found six saloons and dance halls, the resorts of "degenerates" and "fairies", on the Bowery alone. Gay subculture was more highly visible there and more integrated into working-class male culture than it became in the following generations, according to historian George Chauncey.

From 1878 to 1955 the Third Avenue El ran above the Bowery, further darkening its streets, populated largely by men. "It is filled with employment agencies, cheap clothing and knickknack stores, cheap moving-picture shows, cheap lodging-houses, cheap eating-houses, cheap saloons", writers in The Century Magazine found it in 1919. "Here, too, by the thousands come sailors on shore leave, – notice the 'studios' of the tattoo artists, – and here most in evidence are the 'down and outs'". Prohibition eliminated the Bowery's numerous saloons: One Mile House, the "stately old tavern... replaced by a cheap saloon" at the southeast corner of Rivington Street, named for the battered milestone across the way, where the politicians of the East Side had made informal arrangements for the city's governance, was renovated for retail space in 1921, "obliterating all vestiges of its former appearance", The New York Times reported. Restaurant supply stores were among the businesses that had come to the Bowery, and many remain to this day.

Pressure for a new name after World War I came to naught and in the 1920s and 1930s, it was an impoverished area. From the 1940s through the 1970s, the Bowery was New York City's "Skid Row," notable for "Bowery Bums" (disaffected alcoholics and homeless persons). Among those who wrote about Bowery personalities was New Yorker staff member Joseph Mitchell (1908–1996). Aside from cheap clothing stores that catered to the derelict and down-and-out population of men, commercial activity along the Bowery became specialized in used restaurant supplies and lighting fixtures. In the 1930s and again in 1947, there were efforts to change the name of the Bowery to something more "dignified and prosaic", such as "Fourth Avenue South".

=== Revival and gentrification ===
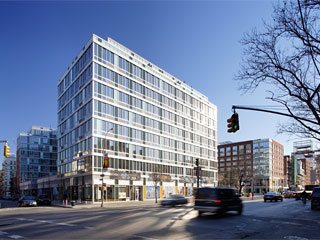
Avalon Bowery Place, one of several new luxury developments on the Bowery

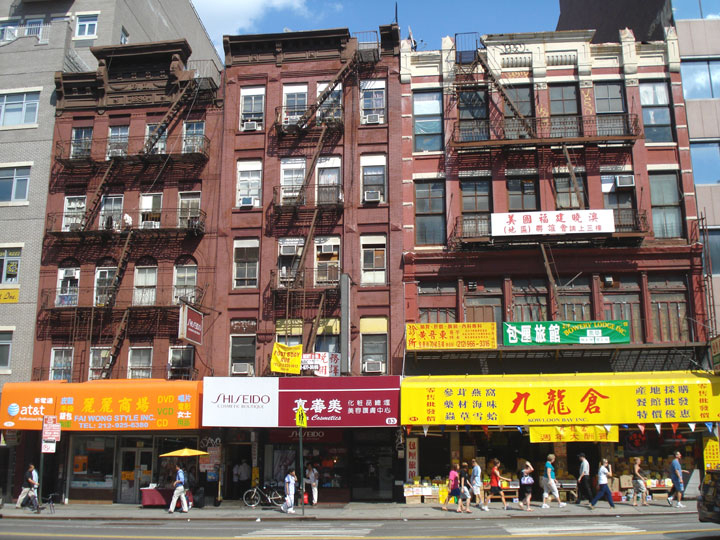
85, 83, 81 Bowery (from left to right) in 2010

The vagrant population of the Bowery declined after the 1970s, in part because of the city's effort to disperse it. Since the 1990s the entire Lower East Side has been reviving, and gentrification has contributed to ongoing change along the Bowery. In particular, the number of high-rise condominiums is growing. In 2007, the SANAA-designed facility for the New Museum of Contemporary Art opened between Stanton and Prince Street. In 2008, AvalonBay Communities opened Avalon Bowery Place, its first luxury apartment complex on the Bowery; the structure includes a Whole Foods Market. Avalon Bowery Place was quickly followed with the development of Avalon Bowery Place II.

The new development has not come without social costs. Michael Dominic's 2001 documentary Sunshine Hotel followed the lives of residents of one of the few remaining flophouses. Construction on the Wyndham Garden Hotel at 93 Bowery in the late Aughts destabilized neighboring building 128 Hester Street (owned by the same man, William Su), and 60 tenants were thrown out of the building with the help of the Department of Buildings. At least 75 tenants were displaced from 83 to 85 Bowery in January 2018 in frigid temperatures due to long-overdue repairs that needed to be made. Tenants accused the landlord of using this displacement to start renovating the buildings into a hotel, and they went on a hunger strike.

The Bowery from Houston to Delancey Street still serves as New York's principal market for restaurant equipment and from Delancey to Grand for lamps.

== Areas ==
=== Upper and Lower Bowery ===
The upper Bowery refers to the portion of the Bowery north of Houston Street; the lower Bowery refers to the portion south of it.

=== Bowery Historic District ===
- The Bowery Historic District
- U.S. National Register of Historic Places
- U.S. Historic district
- New York State Register of Historic Places
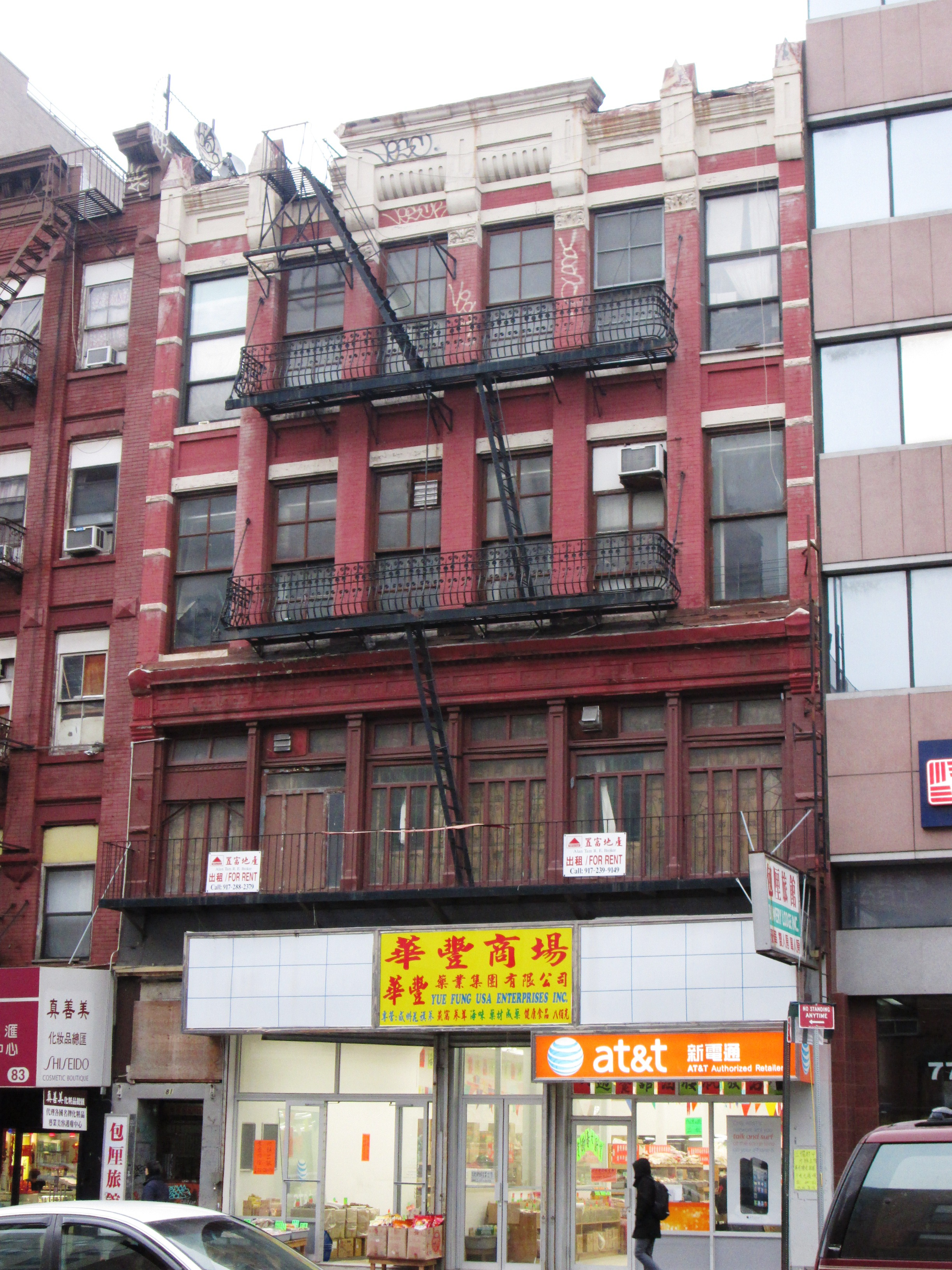
- The Bowery Lodge, one of the last remaining flophouses on the Bowery, and a contributing property to the district

- Location within Manhattan Location within New York City Location within New York
- Location: Chatham Square to Cooper Square, Manhattan, New York
- Area: 50.9 acres (20.6 ha)
- Built: 1626
- Architect: Multiple
- Architectural style: Mid 19th Century Revival, Late Victorian, etc.
- NRHP reference No.: 13000027

Significant dates
- Added to NRHP: January 4, 2013
- Designated NYSRHP: October 27, 2011

In October 2011, the Bowery Historic District was registered with the New York State Register of Historic Places and therefore was automatically nominated for listing on the National Register of Historic Places. A grassroots community organization named Bowery Alliance of Neighbors (BAN) in association with the community-based housing organization called the Two Bridges Neighborhood Council led the effort for creation of the historic district. The designation means that property owners will have financial incentives to restore rather than demolish old buildings on the Bowery. BAN was recognized for its preservation efforts with a Village Award from the Greenwich Village Society for Historic Preservation in 2013. The historic district runs from Chatham Square to Astor Place on both sides of the Bowery.

Bowery Historic District contributing property – Westchester House

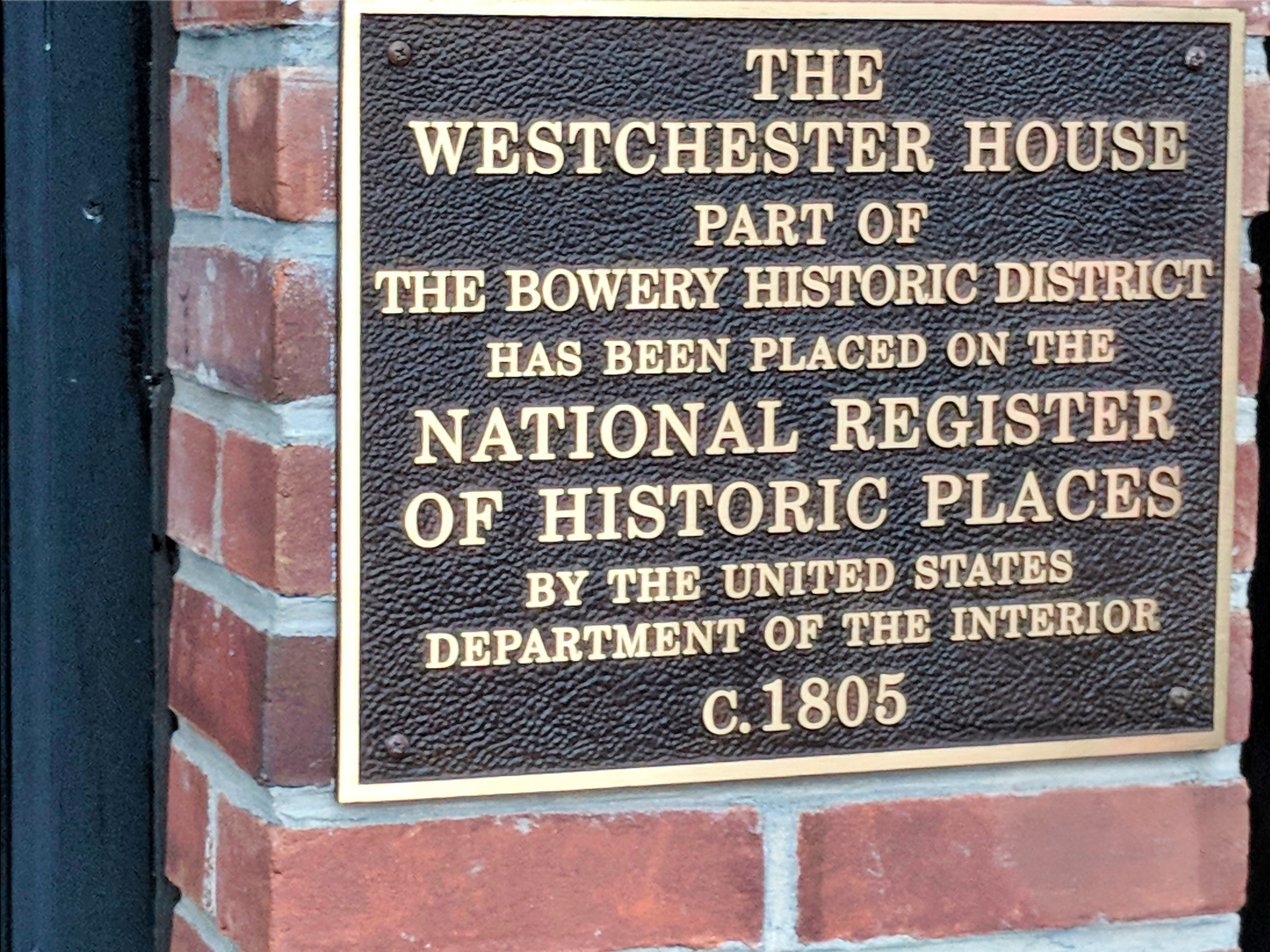
NRHP Westchester House Plaque

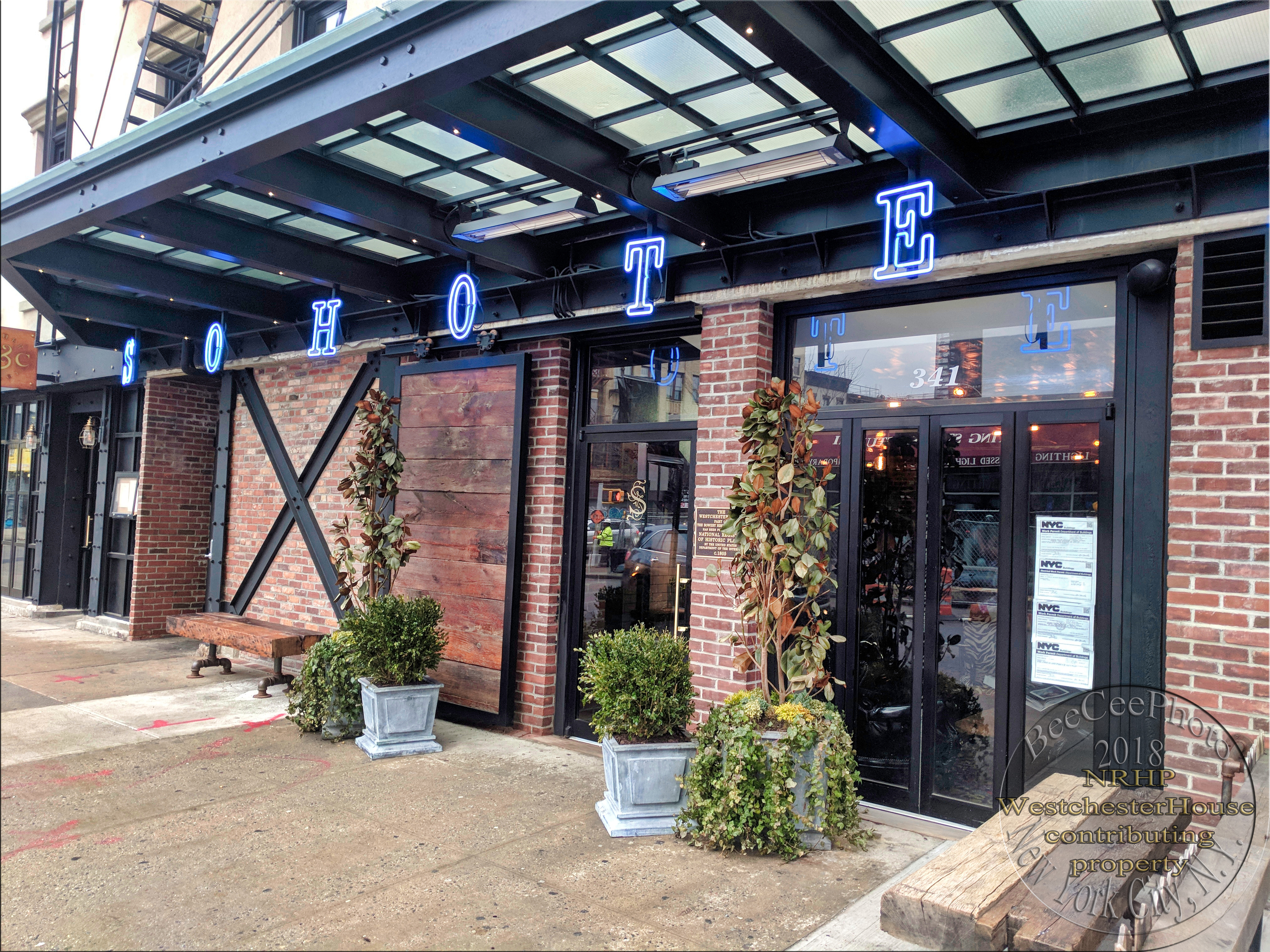
Exterior of the building

One of the most architecturally diverse and historically significant streetscapes in the city; first residence for many immigrant groups. Currently Sohotel

=== Little Saigon ===
New York's "Little Saigon", though not officially designated, exists on the Bowery between Grand Street and Hester Street. New York magazine claims that while this street blends in with neighboring Chinatown, the area is filled with Vietnamese restaurants.

== Notable places ==
=== Amato Opera ===
This company, founded in 1948 by Tony Amato and his wife, Sally, found a permanent home at 319 Bowery next to the former CBGB and afforded many young singers the opportunity to hone their craft in full-length productions with a cut-down orchestration. It closed on May 31, 2009, when Tony Amato retired.

=== Bank buildings ===
The Bowery Savings Bank was chartered in May 1834, when the Bowery was an upscale residential street, and grew with the rising prosperity of the city. Its 1893 headquarters building at 130 Bowery is an official New York City designated landmark, as is the 1920s domed Citizens Savings Bank.

=== Bowery Ballroom ===
The Bowery Ballroom is a music venue. The structure, at 6 Delancey Street, was built just before the Stock Market Crash of 1929. It stood vacant until the end of World War II, when it became a high-end retail store. The neighborhood subsequently went into decline again, and so did the caliber of businesses occupying the space. In 1997 it was converted into a music venue. It has a capacity of 550 people.

Directly in front of the venue's entrance is the Bowery station (J and Z trains) of the New York City Subway.

The club serves as the namesake of at least one recording: Joan Baez's Bowery Songs album, recorded live at a concert at the Bowery Ballroom in November 2004.

=== Bowery Mural ===
Bowery Mural

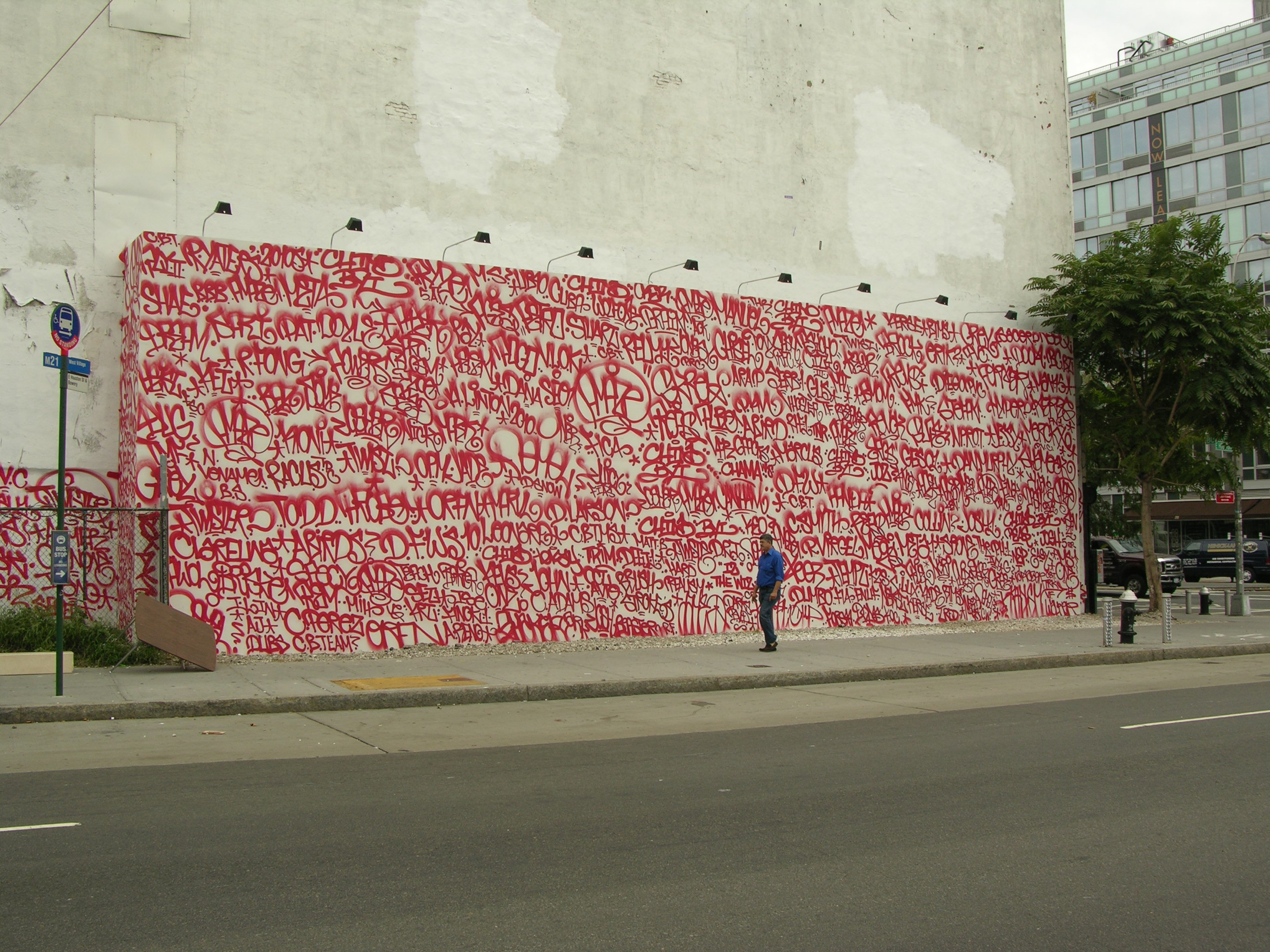
Barry McGee mural (2010)

The Bowery Mural is an outdoor exhibition space located on the corner of Houston Street and the Bowery, on a wall owned by Goldman Properties since 1984. Real estate developer Tony Goldman began the project with Jeffery Deitch and Deitch Projects in 2008. Goldman's goal was to use this wall to present the top contemporary artists from around the world, with an emphasis on artists who work on the streets. Seasonal murals have appeared on the wall curated and organized in collaboration with The Hole, NYC, an art gallery in SoHo run by former Deitch Projects directors Kathy Grayson and Meghan Coleman.

The mural series was initiated from March to December 2008 with a tribute to Keith Haring’s noted 1982 Bowery mural. This was followed by a mural by the Brazilian twin-brother duo Os Gêmeos, which they dedicated to artist Dash Snow, who had recently died from a drug overdose; this was presented from July 2009 to March 2010. The next mural, by Shepard Fairey, was on exhibit from April through August 2010, and was followed by a mural by Barry McGee which celebrated the role of graffiti tagging in the history of New York City street art; it was on display from August to November 2010. This was followed by a tribute to Dash Snow by Irak, which ran from November 24–26, 2010. Other artists to have murals presented include the twins How & Nosm (2012), Crash (2013), Martha Cooper (2013), Revok and Pose (2013), Swoon (2014), and Maya Hayuk.

=== Bowery Poetry ===
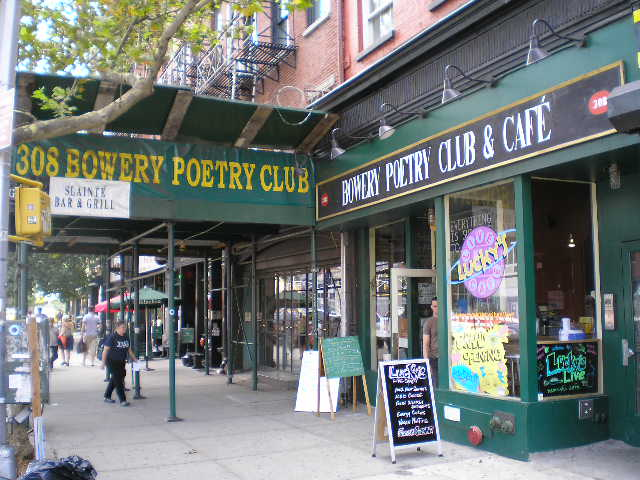
Bowery Poetry Club (2006)

Bowery Poetry is a performance space at Bowery and Bleecker Street. It was founded in 2001 as Bowery Poetry Club (BPC), and provided a home base for established and upcoming artists. It was founded by Bob Holman, owner of the building and former Nuyorican Poets Café Poetry Slam MC (1988–1996). The BPC featured regular shows by Amiri Baraka, Anne Waldman, Taylor Mead, Taylor Mali, along with open mic, gay poets, a weekly poetry slam, and an Emily Dickinson Marathon, amongst other events. The club closed in 2012 and reopened in 2013 as a shared performance space under the name "Bowery Poetry". Bowery Arts + Science presents poetry, and Duane Park presents alternative burlesque in this space.

=== Bowery Theatre ===
The Bowery Theatre was a 19th-century playhouse at 46 Bowery. It was founded in the 1820s by rich families to compete with the upscale Park Theatre. By the 1850s, the theatre came to cater to immigrant groups such as the Irish, Germans, and Chinese. It burned down four times in 17 years, and a fire in 1929 destroyed it for good.

=== CBGB ===
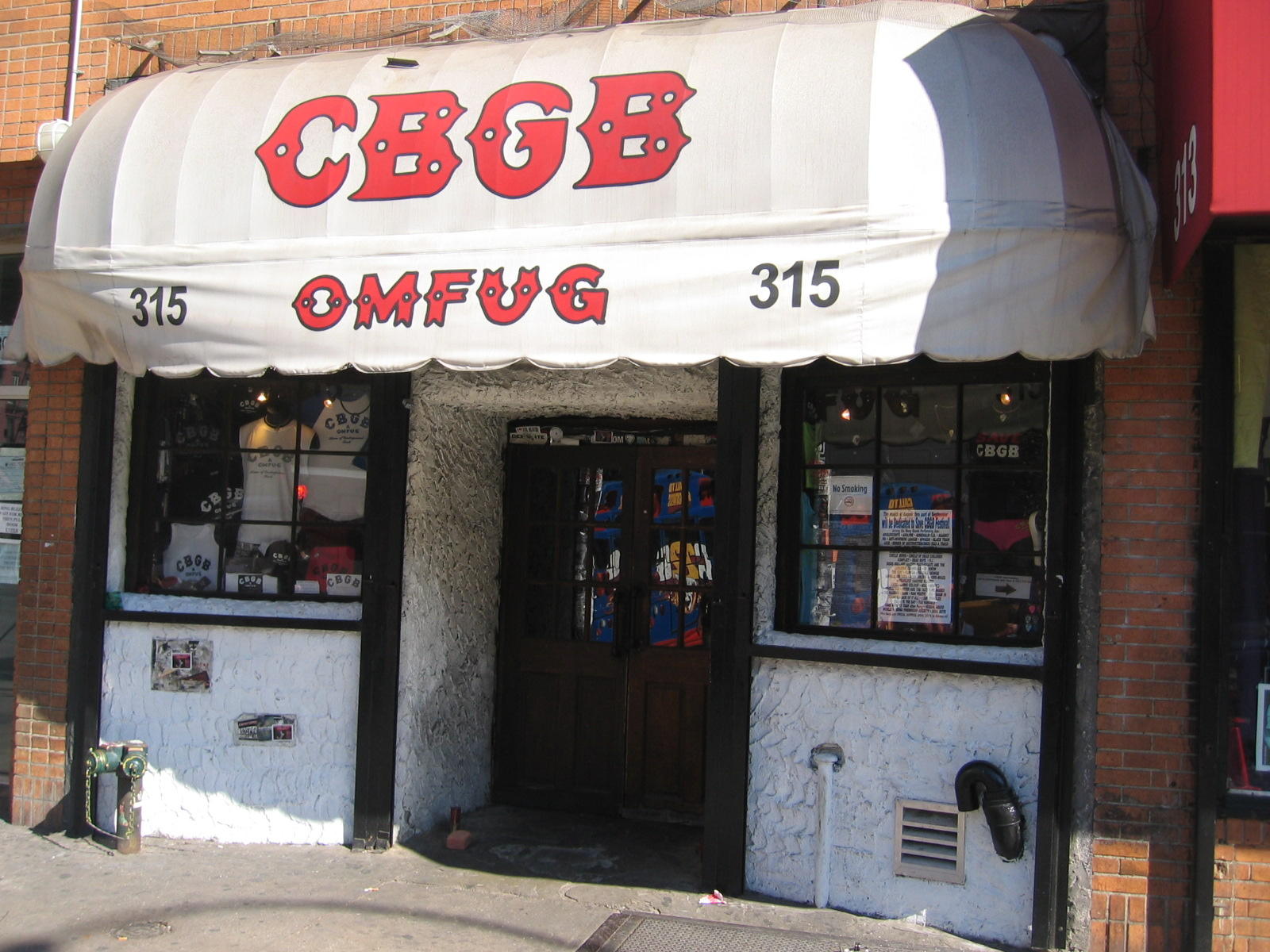
The former CBGBs

CBGB, a club that was opened to play country, bluegrass & blues (as the name CBGB stands for), began to book Television, Patti Smith, and the Ramones as house bands in the mid-1970s. This spawned a full-blown scene of new bands (Talking Heads, Blondie, edgy R&B-influenced Mink DeVille, rockabilly revivalist Robert Gordon, and others) performing mostly original material in a mostly raw and often loud and fast attack. The label of punk rock was applied to the scene even if not all the bands that made their early reputations at the club were punk rockers, strictly speaking, but CBGB became known as the American cradle of punk rock. CBGB closed on October 31, 2006, after a long battle by club owner Hilly Kristal to extend its lease. The space is now a John Varvatos boutique.

=== Miner's Bowery Theatre ===
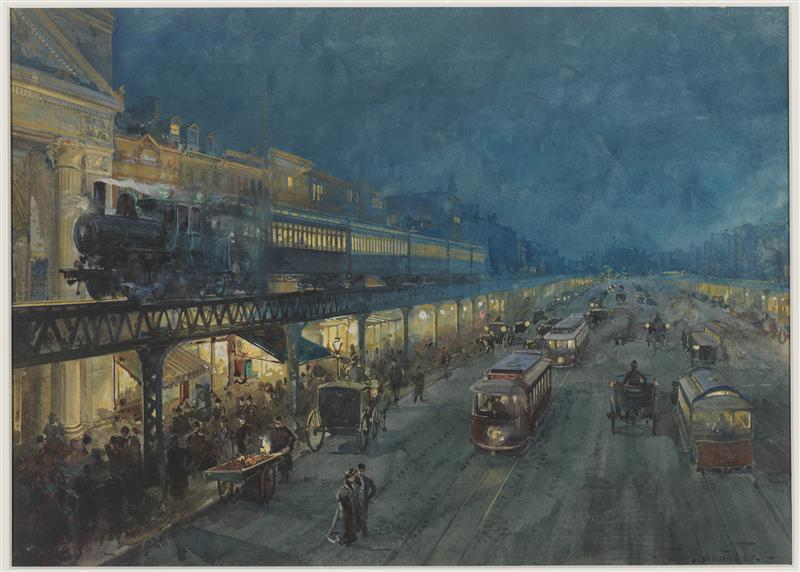
Crowds along the "Bowery at night", c. 1895 painting by William Louis Sonntag, Jr.

Miner's Bowery Theatre was a vaudeville or variety show theater opened by Senator Henry Clay Miner in 1878. The theater was known for its method of encouraging anyone to get on stage and perform on amateur nights, and for its method of removing bad performers from the stage by yanking them off with a wooden hook. Starting in the 1890s, a stage-prop shepherd's hook was used to pull bad performers bodily from the stage, after audience members shouted, "Give 'im the hook." The phrase, "Give him the hook" originated at Miners Bowery Theatre.

=== New Museum ===
In December 2007, the New Museum opened the doors of its new location at 235 Bowery, at Prince Street, continuing its focus of exhibiting international and women artists and artists of color. This new facility, designed by the Tokyo-based firm Sejima + Nishizawa/SANAA and the New York-based firm Gensler, has greatly expanded the museum's exhibitions and space. In March 2008, the museum's new building was named one of the architectural seven wonders by Conde Nast Traveler. The museum has an ongoing Bowery Project honoring artists who lived on the Bowery with taped interviews and archived records.

== Notable people ==
- Béla Bartók lived in 350 Bowery at the corner of Great Jones Street during the 1940s.
- Blondie lived at 266 Bowery
- William S. Burroughs kept an apartment known as "The Bunker" in the former YMCA building at 222 Bowery, from 1974 until he moved to Lawrence, Kansas, in 1981.
- Jim Gaffigan lives with his wife and five children in a five-story walk-up apartment on the Bowery.
- Michael Goldberg lived at 222 Bowery.
- Eva Hesse lived in her studio at 134 Bowery.
- Charles Hinman, abstract artist, lived in the building now adjacent to the New Museum.
- Owen Kildare American writer whose short stories and novels described the grim realities of life in a New York slum, known as "the Mr. Bounderby of American Letters" and "the Kipling of the Bowery".
- Ronnie Landfield, abstract painter, lived at 94 Bowery.
- David McReynolds, Socialist Party presidential candidate and peace activist with the War Resisters League, lived on East Fourth Street off the Bowery.
- Kate Millett, second-wave feminist, artist, scholar, writer (Sexual Politics), now in the U.S. National Women's Hall of Fame, lived at 295 Bowery in the late 1990s to early 2000s.
- Haoui Montaug, doorman-to-the-stars, lived at the corner of the Bowery and East 2nd Street. He committed suicide in his apartment after inviting 20 guests for the occasion.
- A. C. Bhaktivedanta Swami Prabhupada lived in a loft at 94 Bowery from March to May 1966, at the time that the Hare Krishna Movement began in the US. Afterwards, he relocated to his first storefront temple on 2nd Avenue.
- Joey Ramone lived in the area. In 2003 a part of 2nd Street near its intersection with the Bowery was renamed Joey Ramone Place.
- Terry Richardson lives in his studio on Bowery south of Houston Street.
- Mark Rothko, the Abstract Expressionist painter, had a studio at 222 Bowery.
- Cy Twombly lived on the third floor of 356 Bowery during the 1960s.
- Tom Wesselmann had a studio on Bowery in the building now adjacent to the New Museum.
- Jimmy Wright, artist
- Peter Young lived at 94 Bowery.

== In popular culture ==
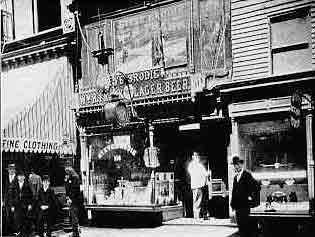
Steve Brodie's bar at 114 Bowery

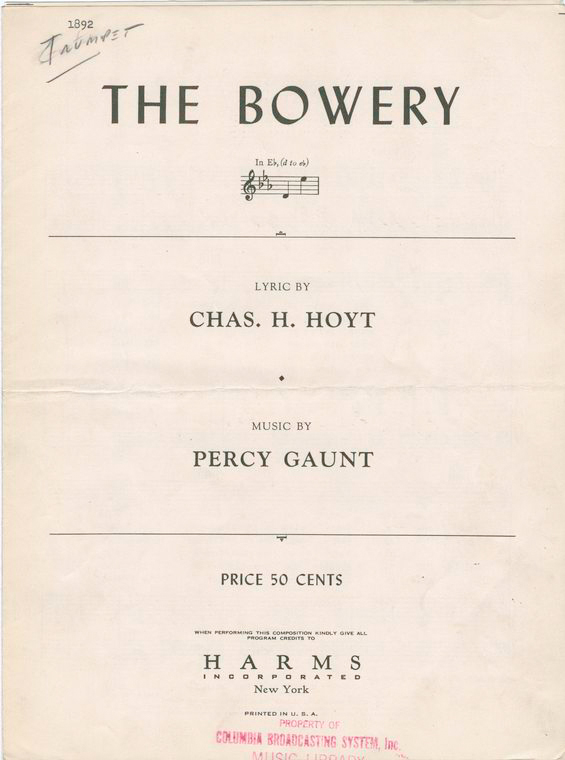
Sheet Music to The Bowery, 1892

=== Literature ===
- The Bowery is the setting for Stephen Crane's first novel, Maggie: A Girl of the Streets (published in 1893), about a poor family living in the neighborhood.
- New York School poet Ted Berrigan mentions the Bowery several times in his seminal work "The Sonnets."
- Jack Kirby and Stan Lee's Fantastic Four #4 (1962), the Human Torch flees to the Bowery to lose himself "among all the other human derelicts..." In one of the Bowery's flophouses, he discovers the amnesiac 1940s-era character Namor the Sub-Mariner.
- The Wild Cards series of books sets the Bowery as Jokertown, the place where the malformed go to live after the Wild Card Virus is released over New York.
- Brenda Coultas' 2003 book of poetry, A Handmade Museum, contains a section called "the Bowery Project" which documents the pre-gentrification process.

=== Music ===
- Over the years, the Bowery has been mentioned in the lyrics of a number of songs, including the Bob Dylan song "Bob Dylan's 115th Dream", from the album Bringing It All Back Home (1965): "I walked by a Guernsey cow / Who directed me down / To the Bowery slums / Where people carried signs around / Saying, 'Ban the bums.'"
- Exuma, Bahamian folk singer and then resident of New York City has a song called "The Bowery" in his 1971 album Doo Wah Nanny. It describes the place as a "skid row".
- The street has also been mentioned in songs by William Ryan Key of Yellowcard, Cockney Rebel, Broken Bells, They Might Be Giants, Nick Cave, Willie Nile, Jim Croce, Regina Spektor, Dire Straits, Bill Callahan, Saint Etienne the Vancouver Twee pop band cub, Sonic Youth, Two Gallants, Steve Earle, Beastie Boys, Paul McDermott, Billy Joel, The Decemberists, Tom Waits, Ryan Adams, The Clash, the Ramones, Fear, Jesse Malin and The Foetus All-Nude Revue, The Lumineers, Earlimart, Deerhunter, Local Natives, Smog, Blood Orange, The Antlers, Lady Gaga, Blossoms, Charli XCX, Kygo, Selena Gomez, Lana Del Rey, Conor Oberst, Stephin Merritt, Dermot Kennedy, Chelsea Cutler and Black Thought among others.
- Rock band Bowery Electric's name was originated by Lawrence Chandler while residing in the area.

=== Stage ===
- The phrase "On the Bowery", which has since fallen into disuse, was a generic way to say one was down-and-out. It originated in the song "The Bowery" from the 1891 musical A Trip to Chinatown, which includes the chorus "The Bow'ry, The Bow'ry!/They say such things,/and they do strange things/on the Bow'ry, the Bow’ry!/I’ll never go there anymore.”".
- On the Bowery, an 1894 play starring Steve Brodie, supposed Brooklyn Bridge jumper and Bowery saloonkeeper.
- In Disney's Newsies, the showgirls featured in the song "I Never Planned on You/Don't Come a-Knocking" are called the Bowery Beauties.

=== Film and television ===
- The 1925 film Little Annie Rooney takes place in the Bowery.
- The Bowery, a 1933 film about Brodie starring George Raft.
- The Bowery is portrayed in the 1934 Krazy Kat cartoon Bowery Daze.
- Bowery at Midnight, a 1942 Monogram Pictures horror film directed by Wallace Fox and starring Bela Lugosi and John Archer. The film was re-released by Astor Pictures in 1949.
- A popular B-movie series made between 1946 and 1958 featured "The Bowery Boys", led by Slip (Leo Gorcey) and Satch (Huntz Hall).
- The 1949 cartoon "Bowery Bugs" tells a fictionalized version of the Steve Brodie story, with Bugs Bunny as Brody's tormenter.
- On the Bowery, Lionel Rogosin's 1956 film, was nominated for the Academy Award for Best Documentary.
- In the 2002 film Gangs of New York, the Bowery is a mentioned territory of the Bowery Boys, a street gang of the late 19th century during the New York Draft Riots.
- A crime lord known as the Bowery King, portrayed by Laurence Fishburne, is a major character in the John Wick franchise.
- The Bowery Boys were a group of characters featured in a long-running series of 48 low-budget, comedic films, primarily produced by Monogram Pictures. While the films themselves weren't always set in the Bowery neighborhood of New York City, the name "Bowery Boys" was a nod to the characters' origins as Bowery B'hoys, a type of street gang from that area in the mid-19th century.

=== Art ===
- The Bowery in Two Inadequate Descriptive Systems, a collection of photographs and poems by Martha Rosler.

=== Advertising ===
- In the 1960s, radio and television commercials for the Bowery Savings Bank featured a jingle with the lyrics "The Bowery, The Bowery / The Bowery pays a lot / The Bowery pays you 6% / Commercial banks in New York simply do not." The number changed according to the amount of interest available on a passbook savings account offered by the bank.

=== Wrestling ===
- Professional wrestler Raven is kayfabe billed as being from the Bowery. The professional wrestler Scott Levy, however, was born in Philadelphia and lives in Atlanta.

=== Podcasting ===
- The Bowery Boys: New York City History is a New York history podcast started in 2007 by Tom Meyers and Greg Young, who were both living on the Lower East Side at the time next to the Bowery.

== See also ==
- Bowery Mission
- Bowery Theatre
- Skid Row Cancer Study
