= Skid Row Cancer Study =

Urological study in the Bowery, New York, US

The Skid Row Cancer Study was a study conducted by urologist Perry Hudson on the homeless men of the Bowery, in Lower Manhattan. In the 1950s and 1960s, Hudson went to skid row, to convince men to volunteer for his study. More than 1,200 men were promised a clean bed, three free square meals a day and free medical care if they were found to have prostate cancer. Hudson's early experience with seeing patients dying at a tuberculosis hospital he was working at led him to develop an interest in prostate cancer. His discovery about the lack of information regarding treatment for the disease and medical training for rectal exams needed to diagnose the disease drove him to pursue research in prostate cancer.

At the beginning of the experiment, Hudson and his colleague selected 141 patients having symptoms and signs for urinary obstruction. However, as the experiment progressed, patients were selected randomly. They were not informed that the biopsies searching for cancer had possible side effects, i.e., rectal tearing and impotence. According to Robert Aronowitz, before the biopsy, the patients underwent a physical examination including blood and urine assays, x-rays of the abdomen, massage of the prostate for cytology and intravenous pyelograms. For the biopsy, a part of the prostate measuring 2.5 × 1.0 × 0.5 centimeters was removed; one half was sent to a pathology laboratory to get tested while the other half was retained for permanent preparation. If the results showed cancer, a perineal prostatectomy and orchiectomy was performed on the men, followed by diethylstilbestrol treatment. The homeless were targeted for these biopsies because they were painful and untested, and less vulnerable populations would not volunteer.

== Background ==
Before securing a lead research position at Columbia University, Hudson received surgical training in the United States Navy and obtained a research position in urology at Johns Hopkins University under William Scott. Over time, Hudson's desire to learn more about prostate cancer led him to pursue a research position at Columbia University; where he led various research projects and was given ownership of various labs. In addition to his academic accomplishments, Hudson was appointed head of urology at Francis Delafield Hospital. Hudson's intent with the Skid Row cancer experiment was to figure out whether or not prostate cancer was terminal and how soon it could be diagnosed. He continued working in the urological field after leaving Columbia and also became involved in "tobacco research, laboratory science…[and] other major preventative research." In addition, the efficacy of Hudson's treatment for what he deemed "early" cancers using methods such as radical surgery, castration, and diethylstilbestrol therapy was still unknown at that time. However, despite this, Hudson's studies were still cited in many urological journals and textbooks in the late 1950s and 60s as a new way to inspect the prostate. Only in a comment by the National Institutes of Health in a response to one of Hudson's requests for funding do they consider malpractice, asking for documentation of his compliance Public Health Service policy. Hudson has practiced in South Pasadena, Florida, Columbia University, New York City, and the Francis Delafield Hospital, in New York City. Hudson died in 2017 at age 99.

== Consequences ==
The ultimate goal of Hudson's research included finding a viable way to use open perineal biopsy (OPB) to diagnose prostate cancer at an early stage. He wanted to see the biological history of the disease and prove that the best way to treat it was to attack any signs of the cancer before it became a serious issue. However, the Bowery Series lacked a control group of patients who were not biopsied, so he was unable to compare data with his experimentation group. He lacked any proof or evidence that the people treated were able to live longer, and were actually subjected to further health risks. Thus, the Bowery Series yielded little effective data, and the patients suffered from side effects of the OPB. Although he was unable to accomplish his goals, Hudson set the precedent for future studies in a push for the screen-and-treat movement. Before the Bowery Series, prostate cancer could only be detected at its latest stages when it was already too late to save the patient's life. However, recent advancements have enabled medical professionals to diagnose the cancer in earlier stages.

Over the course of a decade starting in 1951, Hudson recruited over 1200 subjects from the Bowery flophouses in the "Skid Row" of New York. Many of the recruits were 'down and out' men who suffered from alcoholism and mental illness. To motivate enrollment into the study food, bedding, and medical care were offered but the risks involved with the open perineal biopsy procedures were not fully explained to the patients, and many of them suffered long-term health consequences. Hudson claimed that the procedure, involving excising a 2.5x1x.5 cm core of posterior prostate caused no harm, however an independent research team proved otherwise, reporting post-op incidence of impotence, rectal laceration, and a diminishing sexual function in 24 patients. The assertion that the biopsies caused no harm was again refuted in an interview by one of his residents who claimed that impotence was a common result. The results of the study were published periodically as case series. In the preliminary case series, the symptoms of a 100-person cohort that tested positive for cancer was described. Hudson implemented radical treatments to this cohort that were ambitiously beyond the standard of care with little scientific backing of efficacy. In addition to the surgical castration of these 100 men, he treated them with estrogen hormone therapy, which was later proven to be ineffective and detrimental. The hormone therapy put the patients at risk for heart disease and stroke and caused a loss in muscle tone and overall stamina. In a summarizing study, Hudson reported that out of 686 patients tested, the mortality rate for men with negative biopsies was 20% and the mortality rate for men with positive biopsies followed by rigorous treatment was 30%. Hudson did not publish results for a control group or a group with biopsies done without hormone treatment so the value of these results are unclear.

== Ethics ==
The ethical integrity of the tactics that Hudson used to recruit volunteers for his experiment has been questioned. Some of his methods exploited the fact that his volunteers were mostly homeless men. For example, Hudson would offer his volunteers compensation in the form of meal tickets and temporary shelter in a hospital room. Then, in order to ensure participation, authorities would only present the meal ticket to a volunteer once he showed up for the study. Because they were homeless, the volunteers saw these rewards as very attractive. Additionally, their lack of education made it more likely for the Bowery men to volunteer for Hudson's experiments, as they could not fully understand what they were signing up for. In particular, at the time of the experiment, the method of open perineal biopsy was new and largely untested, and it would have been unlikely for someone to voluntarily undergo the procedure.

Moreover, the volunteers were very ill-informed. They were not provided with clearly written papers about the dangers of the biopsies, such as rectal tearing. Even though the perineal biopsy approach seemed to have its benefits, its potential risk for rectal perforation was quite high.

In an interview, Hudson defended his experiment's ethics. He said he felt no regret, saying the volunteers seemed to him to be fully aware of the aspects involved in the study. Also, they did not receive any monetary incentives from him to participate, which, otherwise, he thought, would "constitute coercion". Once becoming aware of Hudson's practices, an editor of the journal Cancer wrote him a letter asking what protection he had from the university's legal department. Hudson subsequently stopped publishing the results of his research.
