= David P. Flores =

American painter

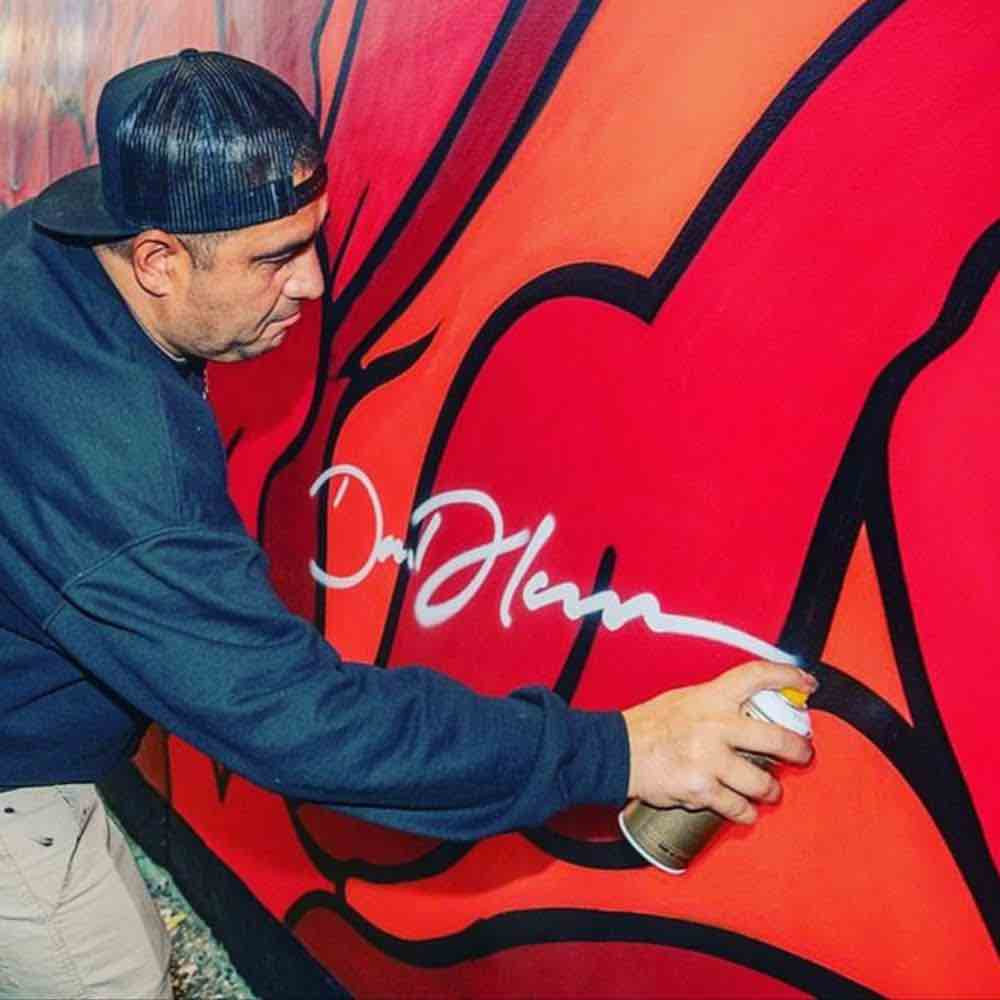
- David P. Flores signing Bowery NYC mural
- Born: February 22, 1972 (age 54); Tulare, California, United States
- Occupation: Artist
- Known for: Disney Block28; Flip Skateboard Graphic Series; Vans and Matt Groening Collaboration Signature Shoe; Bearbrick and Fabrick; Phil Stern Collaboration; Los Angeles California Muralist
- Spouse: Olivia Bevilacqua Flores
- Website: davidfloresart.com

David P. Flores is an American artist, muralist and product designer.

== Early life ==
David Flores was born in Tulare, California. He graduated High School from Tulare Union High School, attended college in Santa Barbara and left with a degree in graphic design. After graduation Flores began his career as a commercial artist in the Skateboarding industry.

== Early career ==
Flores worked for Shorty's Skateboards as a freelance Illustrator and first became internationally published in the pages of Transworld Skateboarding magazine for his illustration of the Black Panthers skateboard bearing logo.

He also contributed to many other skateboarding companies such as Real, Stereo, Thunder, Doh Doh, BlackMagic, Anti Hero, Powell Peralta, Spitfire Wheels, Lucky Bearings, and Deluxe Distribution.

One earlier series of paintings, "Giants", depicted Giant Robots in the City of San Francisco. In 2000, Flores began to design and produce his own limited edition vinyl toys, clothing and paintings with the use of a new style coined "Stained Glass" by the artist himself.

One of Flores' early series, called Icons, was painted in 2000. This series included portraits and renderings in his style of the Mother Teresa, Pablo Picasso, Mos Def, Neil Armstrong, Jacques Cousteau, and Sophia Loren. Flores explains that he "wanted to produce a body of work that was aesthetically pleasing with respect and a nod to artists, explorers and influential people of the past and present". Flores had also reworked other familiar icons such as Disney's Mickey Mouse and Thumper, both released as vinyl toys. As were the Michelin Man, Donald Duck, Mario Bros. and Homer Simpson, in addition to having graphic work shown on MTV's Fantasy Factory. He also had the Kidrobot toy, Dunny, inducted into the Museum of Modern Art.

== Additional experience, collaborations and style ==
Flores says his art was "an instant hit with the global urban art community especially in Japan", where he said his style was well respected and received. A collaborative toy and housewares project was created called "DFWORKS BEARBRICK" and "Fabrick" with Medicom Toy, in the Aoyama District of Tokyo.

Flores is best known for his self-proclaimed "Stained Glass" and mosaic or segmented style. The impact of Flores' graphic style comes in its ability to allow the viewer to reinterpret a popular image they already have associations with. Flores' murals, acrylic paintings and sculptures have many iconic images, including images of late artists such as Andy Warhol, Salvador Dalí, Jean-Michel Basquiat and Robert Crumb.

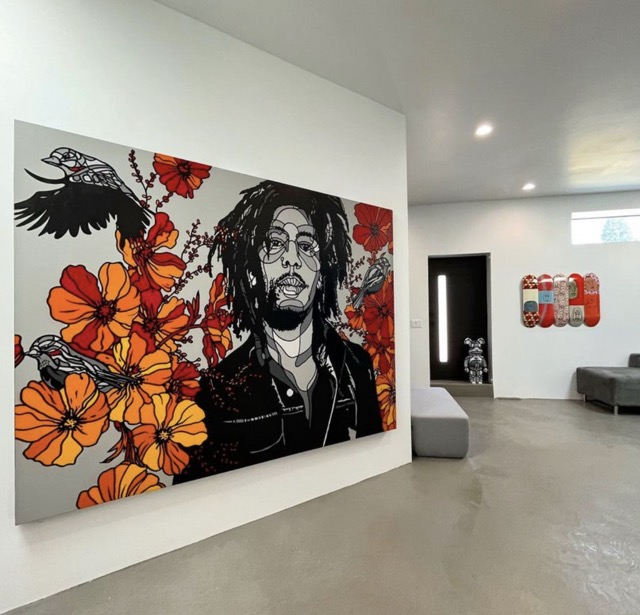
Oversized painting of Bob Marley by David Flores.

Flores has also participated in other commercial collaborations with photographer Phil Stern, Flip Skateboards, Medicom Toy Co., Shepard Fairey, Mural Collaboration, Akomplice Clothing, Disney for Block28, Stüssy, Oakley Sunglasses (with a limited release in Japan), snowboard projects with M3, a rendition of Speedy Gonzales with Warner Brothers, "DFWORKS BEARBRICK" and "Fabrick" with Medicom Toy, Pro-series shoe with DC*SHOES, toys with XLARGE, Kidrobot, Delabarracuda LA, House of Pain, Remix Revista of Argentina, Chouette Luxury of Hong Kong and Simpsons limited edition sneakers with Vans (where he was illustrated as a Simpsons character) himself by Matt Groening.

Other exhibitions include Another Fine Mess (2011), Suede Gallery, photographer Phil Stern(2011), LA Destroyers Nike Event, an exhibition in Hong Kong's Times Square with Disney's Block28 (2009), DFisXL Xlarge gallery Tokyo, Japan( 2006) and Solo at Gallery 1988 (2004).

Flores completed his mural on the historical Houston Bowery Wall in 2021, with his partner Olivia Bevilacqua. Flores said"It was an honor bestowed upon us by Goldman Global Arts. I feel it’s an accomplishment to be invited to showcase my work on such a historic and legendary location. Being able to add my name to the list of greats feels like years of hard work acknowledged. Muraling takes a great physical effort and we have focused our efforts on mastering the craft of public art over the last 12 years. A lot of thought goes into the design process before brush hits wall. For this mural I worked closely with Olivia to create a concept that would provoke a feeling of joy for the viewer. Fun, the excitement of being alive, the feeling of exhilaration. These were the emotions we knew we wanted to share with the public and from that determination we brainstormed imagery for about a month that made us feel that way."

== Collections ==
David Flores work is included in the permanent collection of the Museum of Modern Art in New York City.

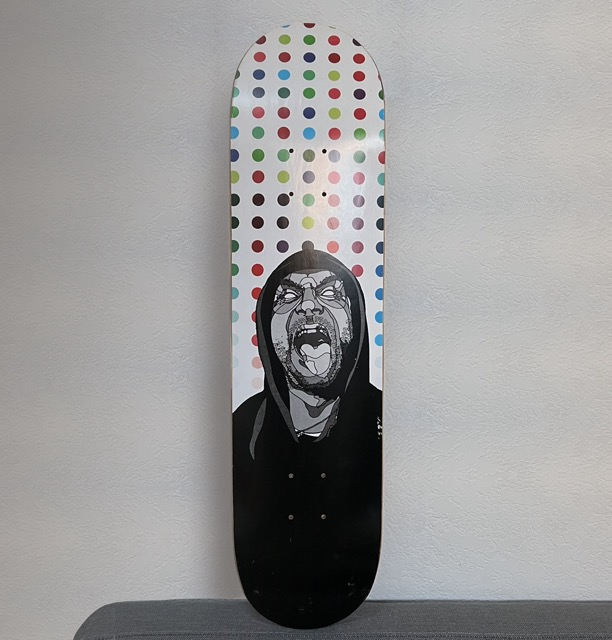
"Hirst", 2008 by David Flores. Archival pigment print transfer on cold-pressed Steep Natural skate deck. Edition of 150. Johnny Blanco Collection
