= Jimmy Wright (artist) =

American visual artist (born 1944)

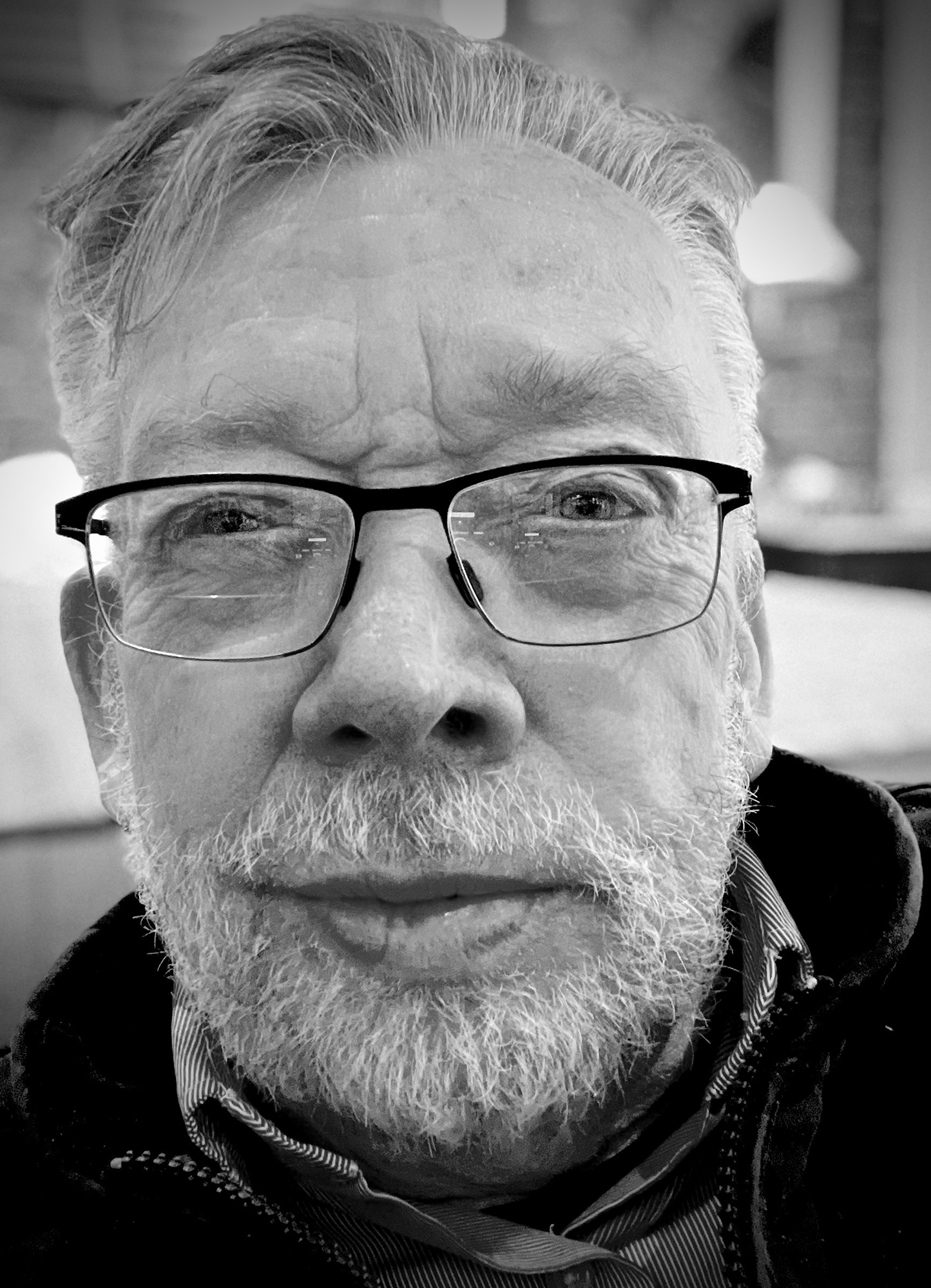
Jimmy Wright, artist - selfie

Jimmy Wright (born 1944) is an American visual artist, who became firstly known in the 1970s for his series of bold paintings representing libertine scenes in gay ambiances in the Meatpacking district of Manhattan; later on, for his unanticipated line of "deeply expressive", often lethargic, sunflowers which earned praise in newspapers and other art sources in the early years of the new millennium. His artwork, including his floating heads and drag themed pieces, are included in the collections of leading museums such as the Metropolitan Museum of Art, the Whitney Museum of American Art, the Art Institute of Chicago, the Hammer Museum, the Springfield Art Museum, His art has been shown in many solo and group exhibitions worldwide. Wright has been a president of the Pastel Society of America since 2013. He was born in Union City, TN and raised in rural Kentucky.

== Career ==
=== Outset ===
Early in the 1960s he attended art courses at Murray State University (Murray, KY), and the Aspen School of Contemporary Art (Aspen, CO). In 1964 he moved to Illinois during four years, to attend the School of the Art Institute of Chicago, where he became exposed to the ideas of imagist master Ray Yoshida and some of his pupils (including Philip Hanson, Christina Ramberg, and Roger Brown). After a lapse including stays in "Little Egypt" (Carbondale, IL) and Los Angeles, CA, and land-travel across Eurasian countries, he moved to his permanent residence in Bowery, New York in 1974.

=== Degrees ===
Wright graduated with honors as a Bachelor of Fine Arts from the School of The Art Institute of Chicago in 1967, subsequently as a Master of Fine Arts from Southern Illinois University in 1971.

=== Climax ===
Wright's move to New York City in 1974 concurred with the height of punk and gay culture upsurge. His participation in the queer nightlife flourishing in the city gave him the opportunity to artistically capture some of its grungy atmospheres, creating a body of work that received recognition years later, when his piece Anvil #1 (ink, pen, inkwash on paper) made its way to the Whitney Museum permanent collection, and whose subject may reminisce the spirit of earlier whore scenes he had depicted in Chicago. The arrival of the AIDS epidemic in the late 1970s brought about an end to the freewheeling life, where the artist had been clipping the themes of his representations. In subsequent years, Wright's depicted blasphemic impressions of the ecclesiastic rituals he witnessed during childhood, among many other themes. Around 1988, the diagnosis of AIDS of the artist's partner Ken Nuzzo somehow prompted a major turn in the contents of Wright's paintings, giving way to the ascent of his series of pastels of sunflowers and other blossoms, a shift lasting for over the following two decades. A retrospective show with many pieces from Wright's early work, including prints, drawings, paintings, and sculptural works, were exhibited at Corbett vs. Dempsey art gallery (Chicago) in 2004. A detailed exhibition of many of his works is available online.

=== Critique ===
Art writer Johanna Fateman discerns on stylistic traits (voluptuous, ebullient, funny) and masterly influences (Bosch, Goya, Toulouse-Lautrec, Yoshida) perceivable in Wright's artwork. David Fierman, in turn, finds his drawings "fantastical and brutally real, sophisticated and youthfully playful". Referring to his oeuvre on the subculture of gay bathhouses and clubs, the artist once ascertained that such scenarios were too rich visually not to record. On his side, critic Grace Glueck celebrates the visual explosiveness, and the abstract fluidity in Wright's blossom pieces, whose dense central hearts shoot out trails of petals and tendrils.

=== Membership ===
He is a member of the Pastel Society of America where he has served as President since 2013, the advisory editorial boards of The Pastel Journal magazine and The Artist’s Magazine and the 1866 Founder’s Circle at the School of the Art Institute of Chicago. His teaches summer courses at the Ox-Bow School of Art, and sponsors art students at Southern Illinois University.

=== Exhibitions ===
Wright's artwork has been the object of many solo exhibitions in the US, among them:

- 1994 - “Sunflowers,” Midtown Payson Galleries, New York, NY New York Magazine 18 Apr 1994, page 165
- 1999 - “Jimmy Wright,” Lizan-Tops Gallery, East Hampton, NY
- 2001 - “Jimmy Wright: Recent Work,” DC Moore Gallery, New York, NY
- 2004 - “Jimmy Wright: Radiant, an overview 1963-2004,” Corbett vs. Dempsey, Chicago, IL.
- 2005 - “Jimmy Wright: An Overview, 1964-2004,” Eagle Art Gallery, Murray State University, Murray, KY
- 2006 - Works on canvas and paper by Jimmy Wright. Argazzi Art, Lakeville, CT
- 2007 - “Lost Women,” Corbett vs Dempsey, Chicago, IL
- 2009 “Jimmy Wright: Twenty Years of Paintings and Pastels,” Springfield Museum of Art, Springfield, MO
- 2016 - Jimmy Wright, New York Underground, Fierman, NYC
- 2016 - Jimmy Wright: New York Underground, Corbett vs Dempsey, Chicago, IL
- 2019 - “The Queen’s Court,” Fierman Gallery, New York
- 2019 - Jimmy Wright solo, M+B Gallery, LA
- 2022 - "Flowers for Ken", Fierman Gallery, Pike St, New York

His art has also been exhibited at international shows in several countries including Austria, UK, Canada, China and Japan.

== Honors ==
- 2018 Elected National Academician, National Academy of Design.
- 2011 Founder’s Award given by the Flora B. Giffuni Foundation, Pastel Society of America
- 2009 Art Spirit Foundation - Gold Medal Award, Pastel Society of America

== Gallery ==
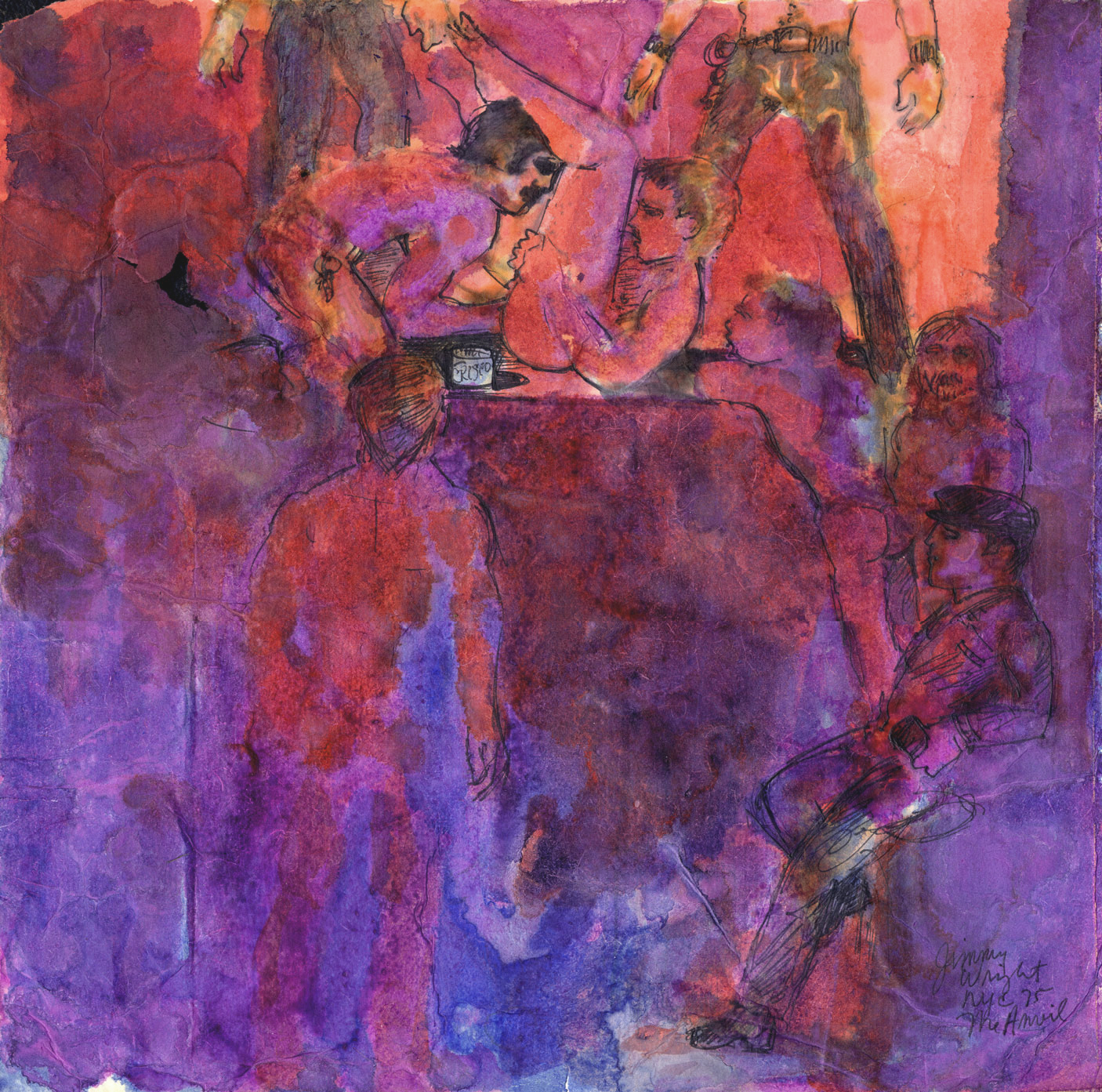
Anvil-No1, ink on paper 10 1/4 × 10 3/16in Whitney Museum of American Art

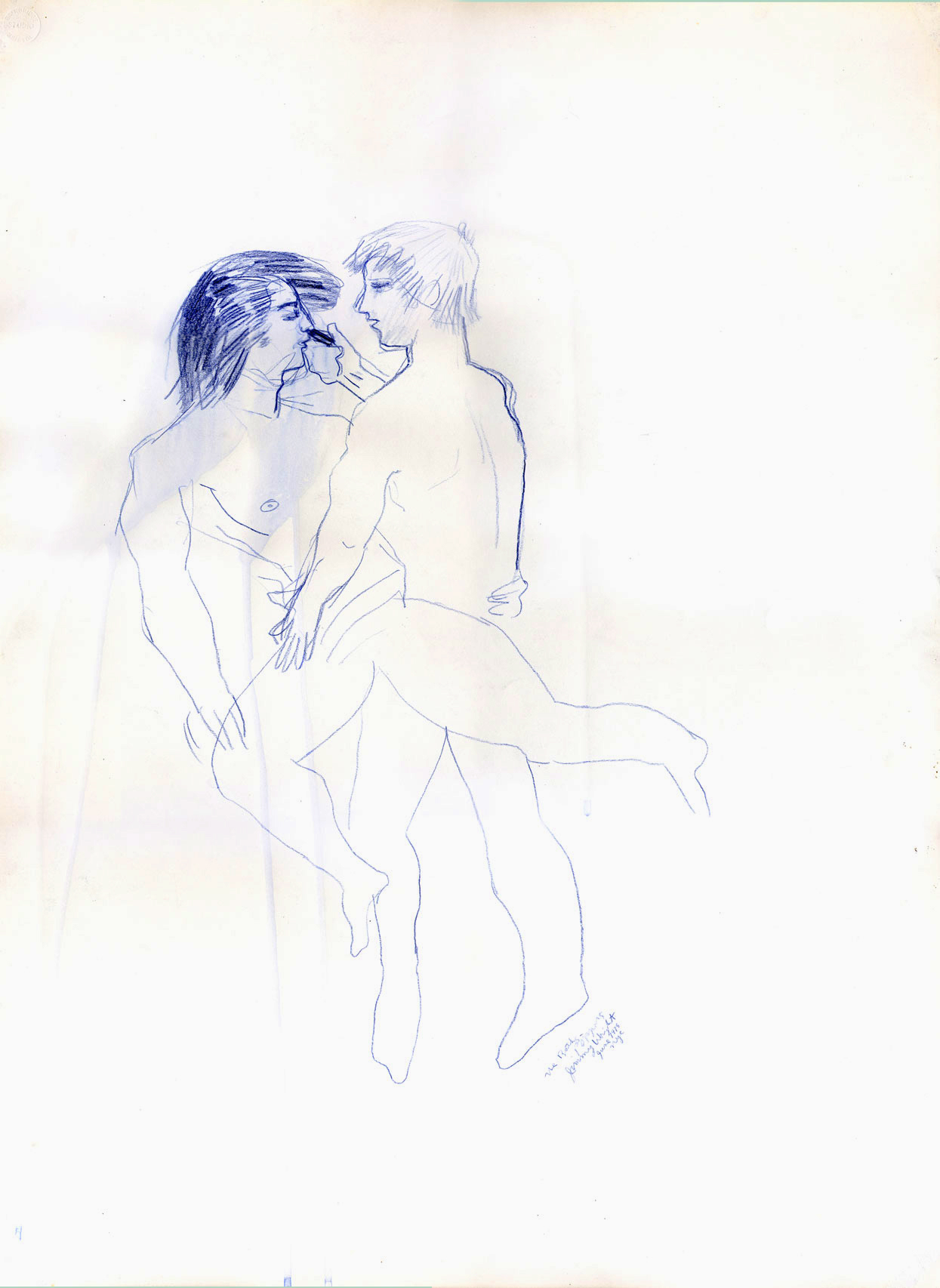
Poppers-Club Baths, Watercolor, crayon on paper

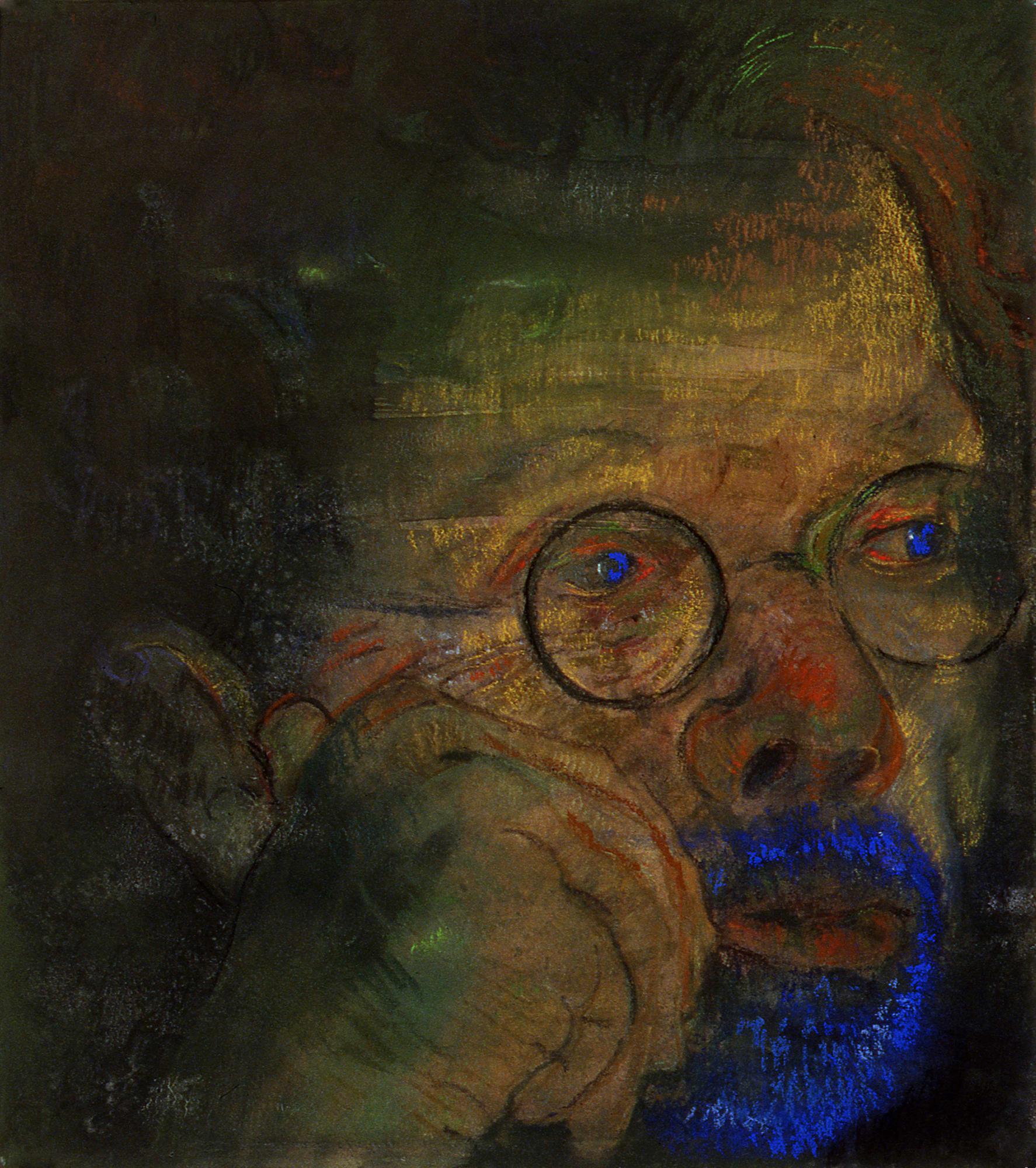
Portrait-of-the-Artist, pastel

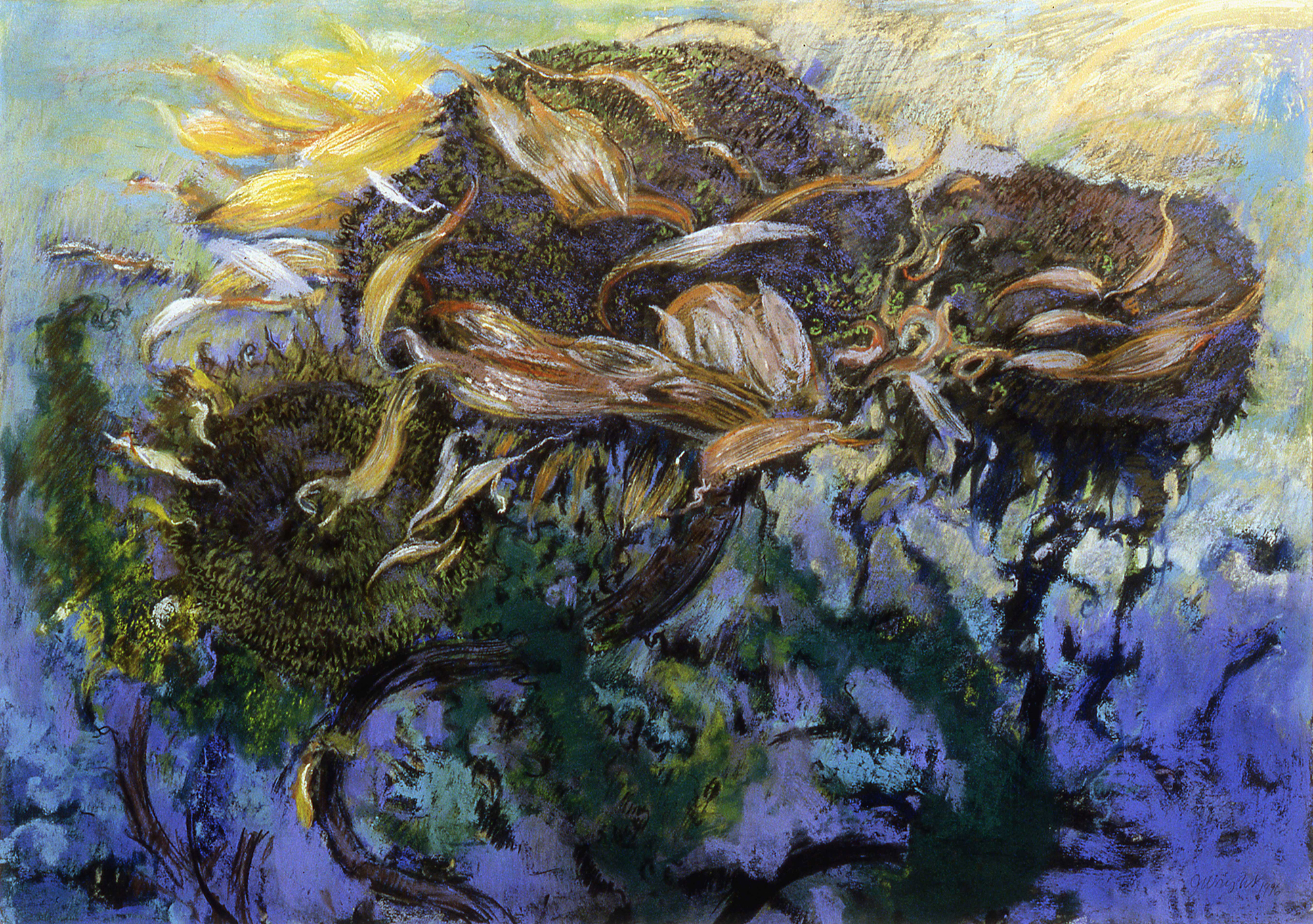
Three-Sunflowers-on-Blue, pastel

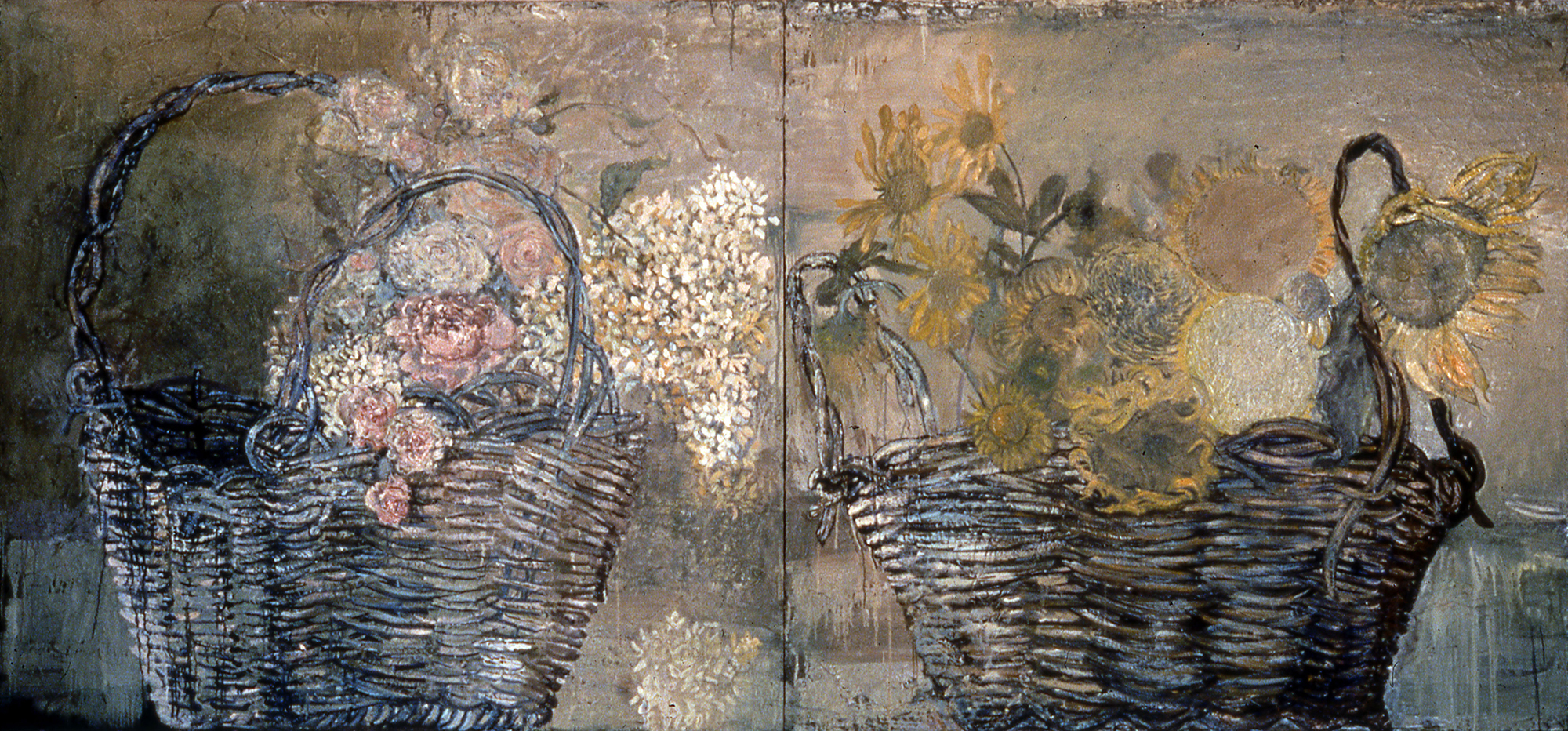
Double Basket, oil on canvas

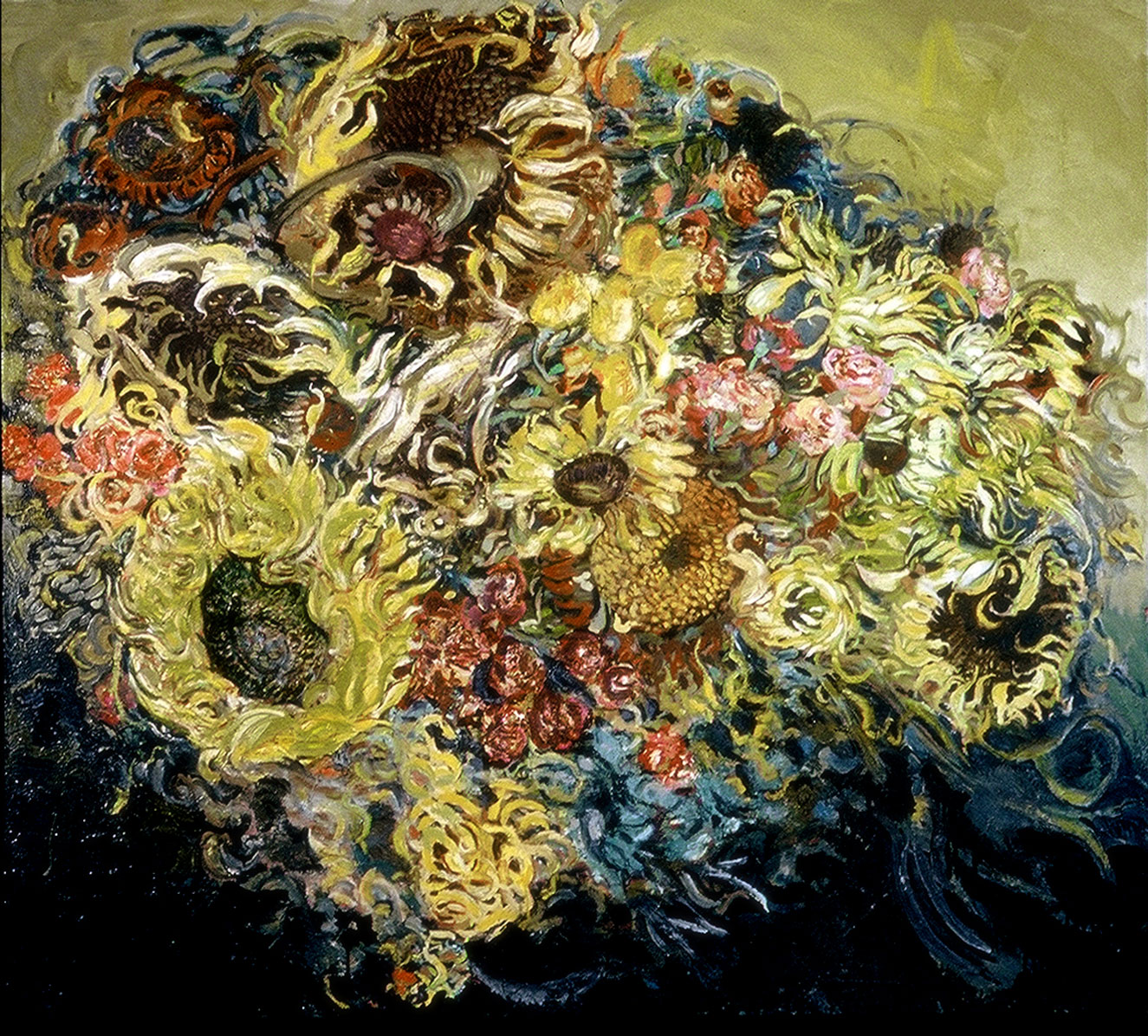
Raft-of-Medusa, oil

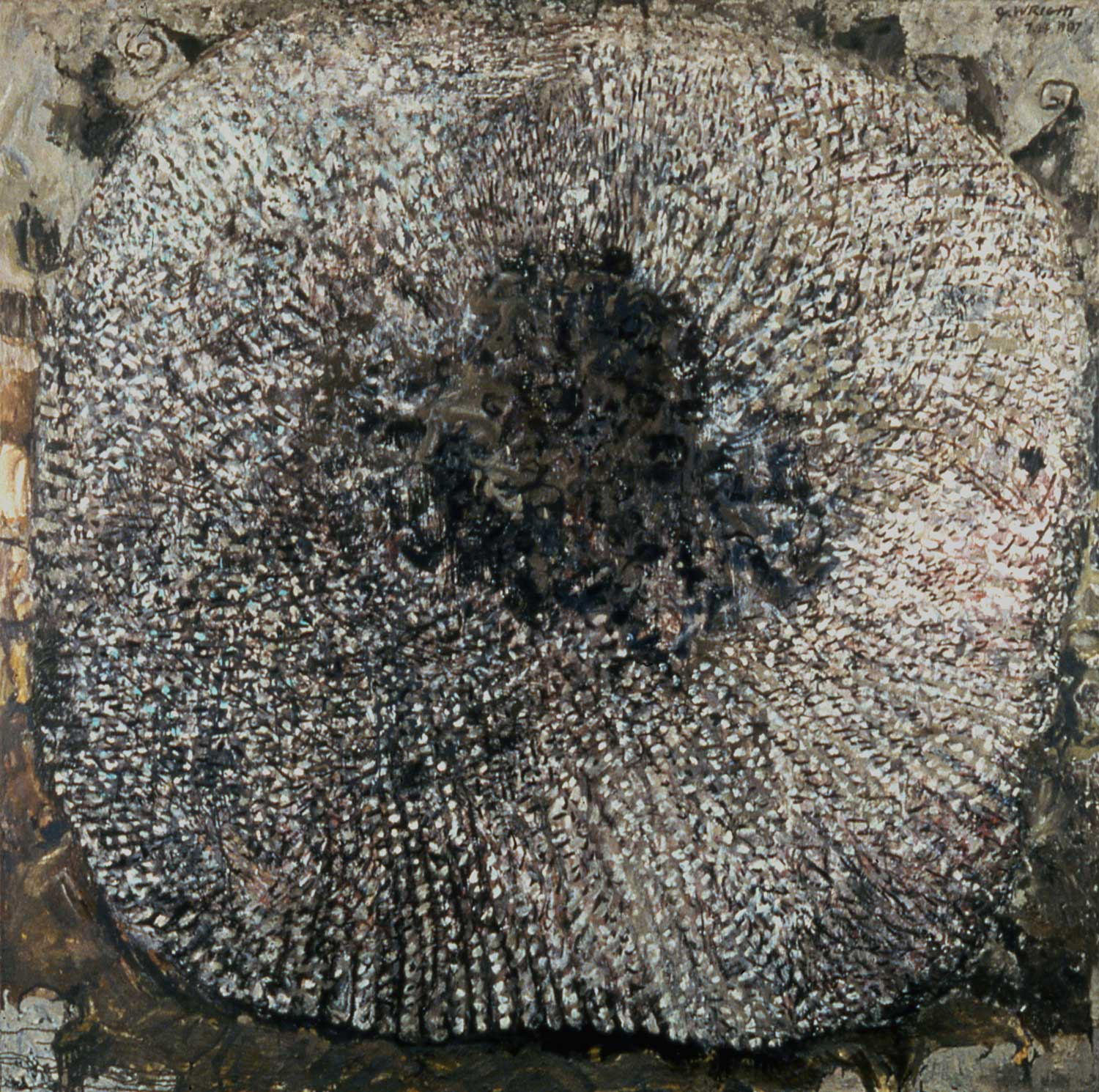
Sunflower-Head, oil

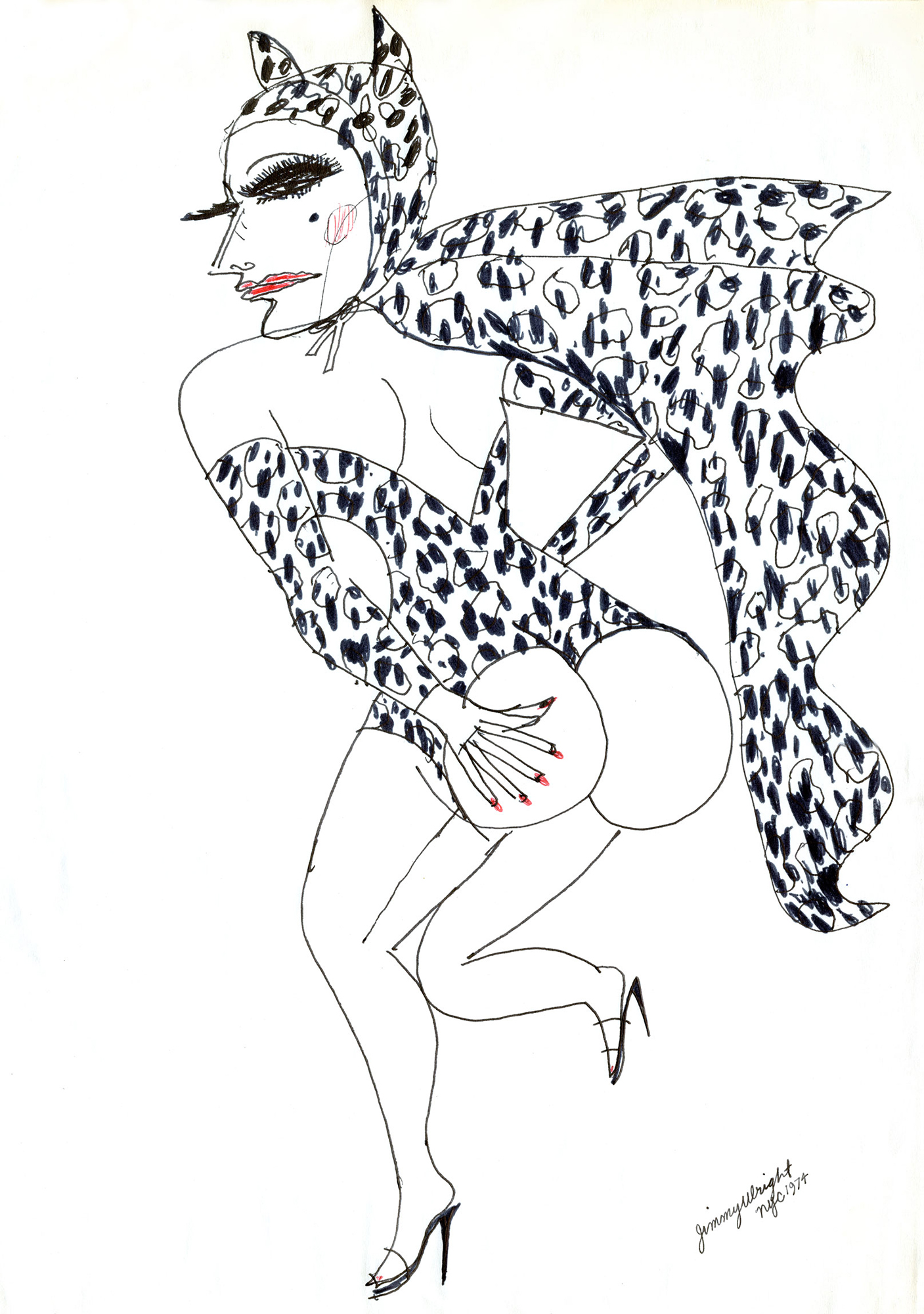
Leopard-Woman, ink on paper
