= Pose (artist) =

American visual artist

Pose (born 1980) is an American contemporary artist, living and working in Chicago, Illinois.

== Career ==
Pose makes traditional fine art, murals, sculptures, as well as graffiti. He has been featured in multiple issues of Juxtapoz Art & Culture Magazine and is known for "bubbling colors, the hidden characters, the insane detailing and intricate design in his graffiti". Shepard Fairey has described his work as "a hybrid of the aesthetics of pop art, graffiti, sign painting and comics that are all areas of his interest done in his own style."

In 2013, with Revok, Pose painted a mural in the Bowery in New York City.

He was listed as on CNN's "Ones to Watch" in 2014.

== Exhibitions ==
=== Solo ===
- 2015 – Work in Progress, WIP Gallery, Los Angeles, California
- 2015 – Bold Notion, Core Club, New York City, New York
- 2014 – Lemonade, Library Street Collective, Detroit, Michigan
- 2014 – Public Matter, The Belt, Detroit, Michigan
- 2014 – Volta w/ Jonathan Levine Gallery, New York City, New York
- 2012 – White Wash, Known Gallery, Los Angeles, California
- 2010 – Rumble, Known Gallery, Los Angeles, California

=== Selected duo ===
- 2016 – Pose & Mel Ramos, Art Wynwood with Galerie Ernst Hilger, Miami, Florida
- 2014 – Pose & Revok, The Mine with Library Street Collective, Dubai, United Arab Emirates
- 2013 – Pose & Revok, Uphill Both Ways, Jonathan Levine Gallery, New York City, New York
