= Tony Goldman =

American real estate developer (1943 – 2012)

- Born: Richard Anthony Goldman (at adoption); December 6, 1943; Wilmington, Delaware, United States
- Died: September 11, 2012 (aged 68); New York City, New York, United States
- Education: Emerson College
- Occupation: Real estate developer
- Spouse: Janet Ehrlich (divorced)
- Children: Jessica Goldman Srebnick; Joey Goldman
- Parent(s): Tillie and Charles Goldman

Tony Goldman (December 6, 1943 – September 11, 2012) was an American real estate developer.

== Early life and education ==
Goldman was born to a single mother in Wilmington, Delaware (Goldman's biological father was overseas in the military during World War II). He was adopted at birth by Tillie and Charles Goldman, who named him Richard Anthony Goldman and raised him on the Upper East Side of New York City in the Jewish faith. He has two step-siblings, a brother and a sister. In 1965, he graduated with a B.A. in drama from Emerson College, located in Boston, Massachusetts.

== Career ==
Goldman was instrumental in the refurbishment of the architecturally significant vicinity of Miami Beach, Florida; the Wynwood district of Miami, Florida; the New York City, New York, neighborhood of SoHo; and 13th Street in Philadelphia, Pennsylvania.

After school, he worked for his uncle who had a real estate business. In 1968, he started his own real estate company, Goldman Properties.

In 1976, Goldman was attracted to the historic cast-iron architecture of Manhattan neighborhood SoHo and decided to invest and rehabilitate buildings in the area. He bought and renovated 18 buildings in the area and opened restaurants to attract young people to the neighborhood.

While attending a conference in Miami in 1985, Goldman toured the neglected art deco buildings of Miami Beach with historic preservationists. Seeing the potential of the city, he began buying one building a month for 18 months. Although other properties in the area were already being rehabilitated, it has been said that "Tony was the central person in getting South Beach going."

By the mid-2000s, Goldman began buying buildings in Miami's Wynwood neighborhood, another neglected area where he saw potential. He worked with art dealer Jeffrey Deitch to launch Wynwood Walls, a large permanent collection of outdoor murals. He was also built the Wynwood Garage, a mixed-used building. He also opened a restaurant and performance studio to help generate interest in the area. By August 2011, Goldman Properties had offices in New York, Boston, Philadelphia and Miami Beach with 250 employees. The then revenue of the company was approximately $75 million.

Goldman was also responsible for the launching of the Bowery Mural, an outdoor exhibition space in New York City on a wall located on the corner of Houston Street and the Bowery.

== Award ==
Goldman was awarded the Louise du Pont Crowninshield Award from the National Trust for Historic Preservation in 2010 for lifetime achievement.

== Personal life and death ==
In 1966, Goldman married Janet Ehrlich, a schoolteacher; they had two children: Jessica Goldman Srebnick and Joey Goldman. The couple divorced in 1977 but later remarried in 1986. Goldman died from heart failure on September 11, 2012, at age 68, in New York City. Services were held at Temple Emanu-El in Miami Beach, Florida. His daughter succeeded him as CEO of Goldman properties.

When he was in his 50s, he reunited with his biological parents, Shirley and Ray Meyers, who had married after Ray's deployment during World War II. He has two biological brothers and one sister.

== See also ==
- List of Emerson College people
- List of people from New York City
- List of people from Wilmington, Delaware
