= List of Cornish College of the Arts people =

Following is a list of notable people associated with the Cornish College of the Arts, located in the American city of Seattle, Washington.

== Presidents ==
- Nellie Cornish (1914–1939)
- Melvin Strauss (1975–1985)
- Robert N. Funk (1985–1994)
- Sergei P. Tschernisch (1994–2011)
- Nancy Uscher (since 2011)

== Notable faculty ==
=== Music ===
- Guy Anderson
- Eric Banks
- Vicki Boeckman
- Jay Clayton
- Corigliano Quartet (artist-in-residence)
- Chuck Deardorf
- Christopher DeLaurenti
- Jody Diamond (artist-in-residence)
- Robert Dick (artist-in-residence)
- Bill Frisell (artist-in-residence)
- Janice Giteck
- Randy Halberstadt
- Lou Harrison (artist-in-residence)
- Bern Herbolsheimer
- Wayne Horvitz
- Laura Kaminsky
- Bun-Ching Lam
- Art Lande
- Rudresh Mahanthappa (artist-in-residence)
- Ingrid Matthews
- Myra Melford (artist-in-residence)
- Meredith Monk (artist-in-residence)
- Butch Morris (artist-in-residence)
- Michael Nicolella
- Hossein Omoumi (artist-in-residence)
- Frank J. Oteri (artist-in-residence)
- Gary Peacock
- Julian Priester
- Jovino Santos Neto
- Seattle Chamber Players (artist-in-residence)
- Adam Stern
- Stephen Stubbs
- Paul Taub
- Tom Varner
- Linda Waterfall
- Melia Watras (artist-in-residence)
- Matt Wilson (artist-in-residence)

=== Dance ===
- John Cage (accompanist)
- Seán Curran (artist-in-residence)
- David Dorfman (artist-in-residence)
- Bill Evans (artist-in-residence)
- Syvilla Fort (artist-in-residence)
- David Gordon (artist-in-residence)
- Martha Graham
- Alonzo King (artist-in-residence)
- Ralph Lemon (artist-in-residence)
- Liz Lerman (artist-in-residence)
- Donald McKayle (artist-in-residence)
- Bebe Miller (artist-in-residence)
- Mark Morris (artist-in-residence)
- Steve Paxton (artist-in-residence)
- Elizabeth Streb (artist-in-residence)
- Twyla Tharp (artist-in-residence)
- Jennifer Tipton (artist-in-residence)

=== Design ===
- Ellen Forney

Guest and visiting artists

- Ping Chong (artist-in-residence)
- Hand2Mouth Theatre, Portland, OR

=== Fine art ===
- John Butler
- William Cumming
- Imogen Cunningham (artist-in-residence)
- Thomas J. Duffy
- Jesse Edwards
- Morris Graves
- Gary Hill
- Charles Stokes
- Mark Tobey
- Windsor Utley
- Ron Wigginton

== Notable alumni ==
=== Dance ===
- Merce Cunningham
- Ann Reinking

=== Music ===
- Magdalen Hsu-Li
- Mary Lambert
- Karyna McGlynn
- Todd McHatton
- Patrick O'Hearn
- Reggie Watts
- Steve White of The Blue Man Group
- Frances Williams
- Michael Wilton

=== Theater ===
- Wolfe Bowart (clown, physical theater writer, performer)
- Brendan Fraser (actor)
- David Gasman (actor, director, voiceover artist)
- Chet Huntley (NBC broadcast legend)
- C.S. Lee (actor, Showtime's Dexter)
- Jinkx Monsoon (Hera Hoffer) (actor, singer)

=== Fine art ===
- Clayton Lewis (painter and sculptor)
- James McMullan
- Felicia Oh
- Mark Velasquez
- Ron Wigginton

=== Film ===
- Colleen Atwood, costume designer, three-time Academy Award winner

== See also ==
- List of people from Seattle
