= Mud Pond =

Mud Pond may refer to:

- Mud Pond (Sunapee, New Hampshire)
- Mud Pond (Delaware County, New York)
- Mud Pond (Morehouse Lake, New York)
