= McHatton =

McHatton is an English surname. Notable people with the surname include:

- Robert L. McHatton (1788–1835), American politician
- Todd McHatton (fl. 1987–2013), American singer, songwriter, musician, performer, artist, and puppeteer
