= Marshall Park (Seattle) =

Park in Seattle, Washington, U.S.

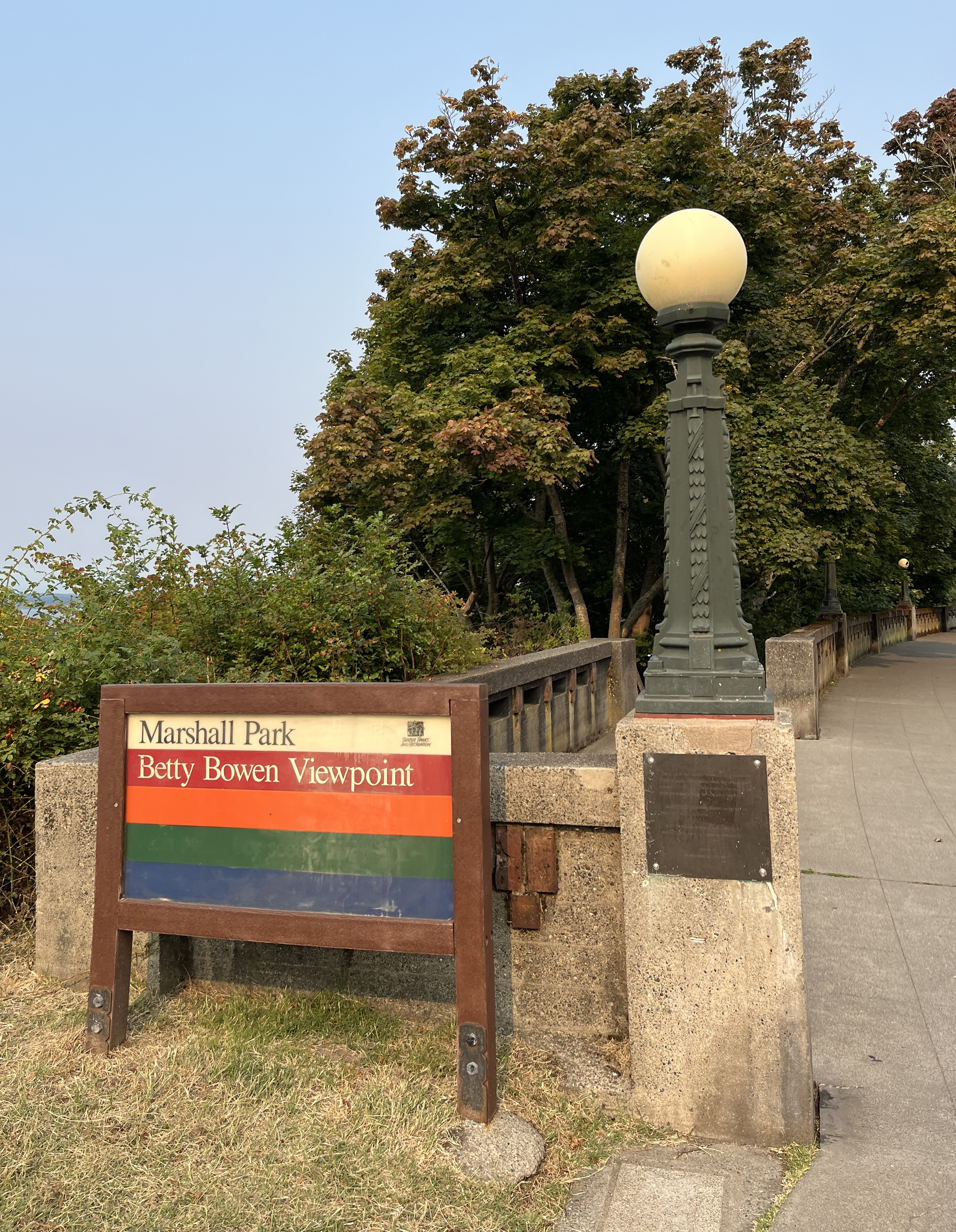
- Interactive map of Marshall Park
- Type: Urban Park
- Location: Seattle, Washington
- Coordinates: 47°37′46″N 122°22′01″W
- Area: 0.78 acres (0.32 ha)
- Operated by: Seattle Parks and Recreation

Marshall Park is a 0.78-acre (0.32-hectare) park in Seattle, Washington. Once known as "Phelps Place", the small park across from Parsons Gardens Park provided a viewpoint for sightseers until the expansion and improvement of Queen Anne Boulevard. In 1960, the park was named after the Marshalls. Betty Bowen Viewpoint was added to the park in 1977–1978. Today, the concrete walkway contains unsigned artwork by artists Guy Anderson, Kenneth Callahan, Morris Graves, Victor Steinbrueck, Charles Stokes and Margaret Tompkins.

== See also ==
- List of parks in Seattle
