= Navigability =

Capacity of a body of water to allow the passage of vessels at a given time

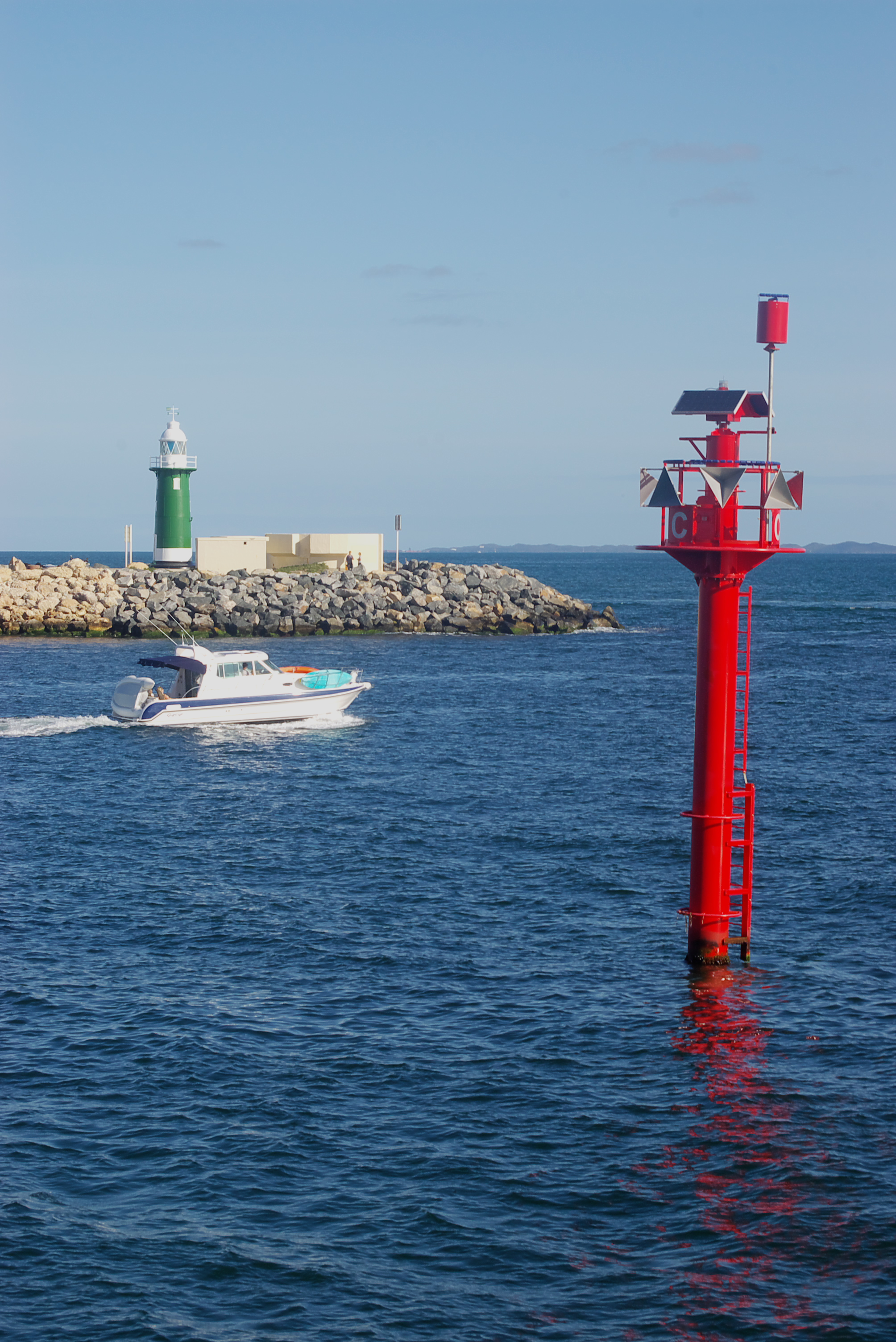
Navigation markers, entrance of Fremantle harbour and the Swan River, Western Australia

A body of water, such as a canal, lake, reservoirs, or river, is navigable if it is calm, deep, and wide enough for a watercraft (e.g. boats) to pass safely. Navigability is also referred to in the broader context of a body of water having sufficient under keel clearance for a vessel.

Such a navigable water is called a waterway, and is preferably with few obstructions against direct traverse that need avoiding, such as rocks, reefs or trees. Bridges built over waterways must have sufficient clearance. High flow speed may make a channel unnavigable due to risk of ship collisions. Waters may be unnavigable because of ice, particularly in winter or high-latitude regions. Navigability also depends on context: a small river may be navigable by smaller craft such as a motorboat or a kayak, but unnavigable by a larger freighter or cruise ship. Shallow rivers may be made navigable by the installation of locks that regulate flow and increase upstream water level, or by dredging that deepens parts of the stream bed.

== Inland water transport systems ==
Inland water transport (IWT) systems have been used for centuries in countries including India, China, Egypt, the Netherlands, the United States, Germany, and Bangladesh. In the Netherlands, IWT handles 46% of the nation's inland freight; 32% in Bangladesh, 14% in the United States, and 9% in China.

=== In the United States ===
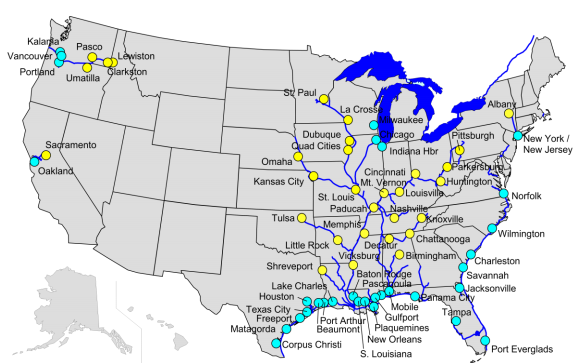
Inland Waterway Connection

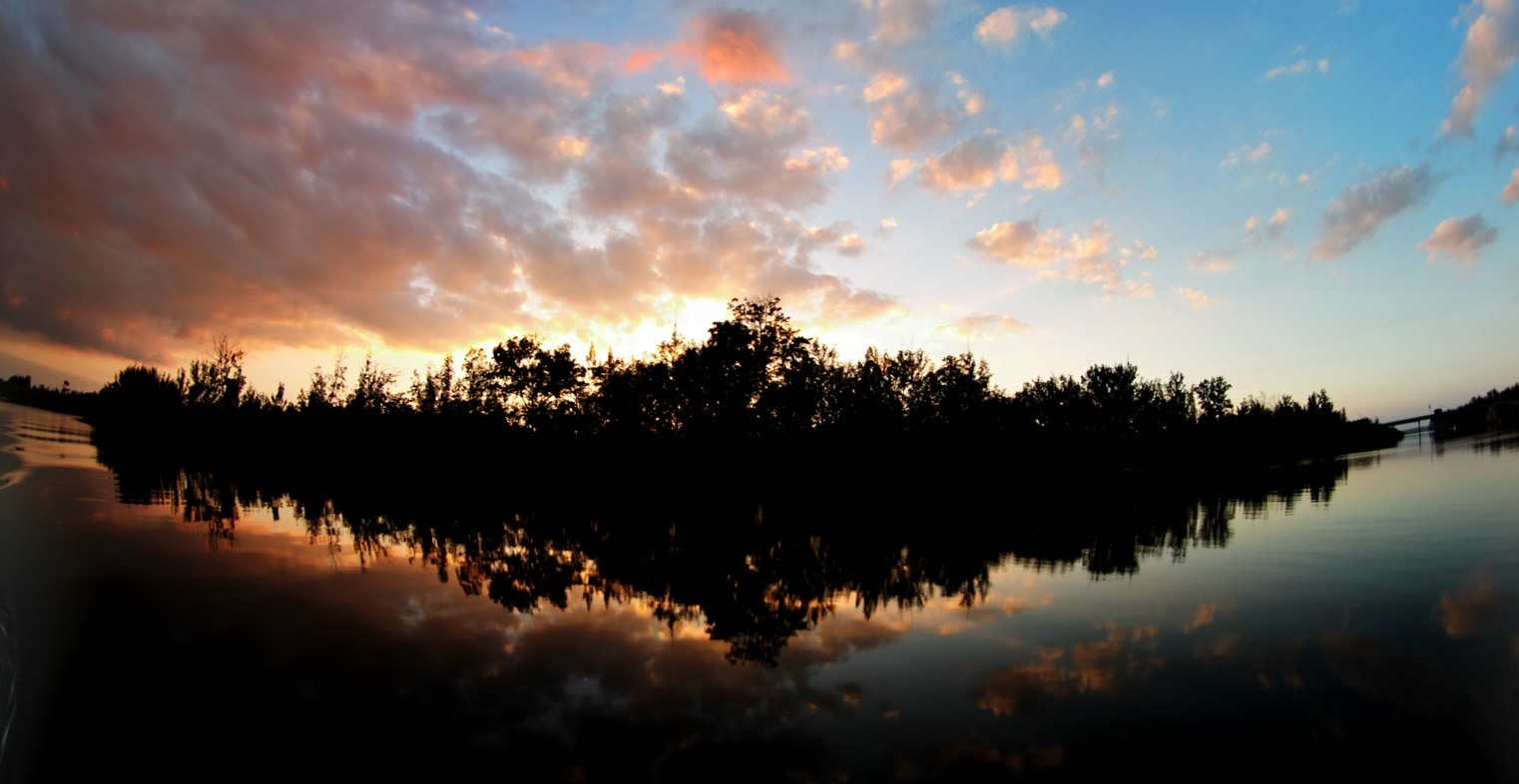
Sunset on the Intracoastal Waterway

What constitutes "navigable" waters can not be separated from the context in which the question is asked. Numerous federal agencies define jurisdiction based on navigable waters, including admiralty jurisdiction, pollution control, to the licensing of dams, and even property boundaries. The numerous definitions and jurisdictional statutes have created an array of case law specific to which context the question of navigability arises. Some of the most commonly discussed definitions are listed here.

Navigable waters, as defined by the US Army Corps of Engineers as codified under 33 CFR 329, are those waters that are subject to the ebb and flow of the tide, and those inland waters that are presently used, or have been used in the past, or may be susceptible for use to transport interstate or foreign commerce while the waterway is in its ordinary condition at the time of statehood. Section 10 of the Rivers and Harbors Act of 1899 (33 U.S.C. 403), approved 3 March 1899, prohibits the unauthorized obstruction of a navigable water of the U.S. This statute also requires a permit from the U.S. Army Corps of Engineers for any construction in or over any navigable water, or the excavation or discharge of material into such water, or the accomplishment of any other work affecting the course, location, condition, or capacity of such waters. However, the ACOE recognizes that only the judiciary can make a definitive ruling as to which are navigable waters.33 CFR 329

For the purposes of transferring property title into public property, the definition of a Navigable waterways closely follows 33 CFR 329. For the purpose of establishing which river is public and therefore state-owned, what is navigable is a constitutional question defined by Federal case law. (See PPL Montana v Montana (2012).) If a river was considered navigable at the time of statehood, the land below the navigable water was conveyed to the state as part of the transportation network in order to facilitate commerce. Most states retained title to these navigable rivers in trust for the public. Some states divested themselves of title to the land below navigable rivers, but a federal navigable servitude remains if the river is a navigable waterway. Title to the lands submerged by smaller streams are considered part of the property through which the water flows and there is no 'public right' to enter upon private property based on the mere presence of water.

The scope of the Federal Energy Regulatory Commission (FERC) authority was granted under the Federal Power Act, 1941 (16 U.S.C 791). Such authority is based on congressional authority to regulate commerce; it is not based exclusively on title to the riverbed [16 U.S.C. 796(8)] or even navigability. Therefore, FERC's permitting authority extends to the flow from non-navigable tributaries in order to protect commerce downstream, [US v. Rio Grande Irrigation, 174 U.S. 690, 708 (1899)], [Oklahoma v. Atkinson, 313 US 508, 525].

Also, the Clean Water Act has introduced the terms "traditional navigable waters," and "waters of the United States" to define the scope of federal jurisdiction under the Clean Water Act. Here, "Waters of the United States" include not only navigable waters, but also tributaries of navigable waters and nearby wetlands with "a significant nexus to navigable waters"; both are covered under the Clean Water Act. Therefore, the Clean Water Act establishes Federal jurisdiction beyond "navigable waters" extending a more limited federal jurisdiction under the Act over private property which may at times be submerged by waters. Because jurisdiction under the Clean Water Act extends beyond public property, the broader definitions of "traditional navigable" and "significant nexus" used to establish the scope of authority under the Act are still ambiguously defined and therefore open to judicial interpretation as indicated in two U.S. Supreme Court decisions: Carabell v. United States and Rapanos v. United States. However, because authority under the Act is limited to protecting only navigable waters, jurisdiction over these smaller creeks is not absolute and may require just compensation to property owners when invoked to protect downstream waters.

Finally, a water-body is presumed non-navigable with the burden of proof on the party claiming it is navigable. The U.S. Forest Service considers a waterbody not navigable until is adjudicated otherwise. See Whitewater v. Tidwell 770 F. 3d 1108 (2014). Therefore, and public rights associated with navigability cannot be presumed to exist without a finding of navigability.

==== Confusion over "navigability" ====
'Navigability' is a legal term of art, which can lead to considerable confusion. In 2009, journalist Phil Brown of Adirondack Explorer defied private property postings to make a direct transit of Mud Pond by canoe, within a tract of private property surrounded by public land within the Adirondack Park. In New York State, waterways that are 'navigable-in-fact' are considered public highways, meaning that they are subject to an easement for public travel, even if they are on private land. Brown argued that because he recreationally 'navigated' the waterway through private property, it was therefore a public highway. He prevailed in the trial court when sued for trespassing by the owners of the property, a decision upheld by the New York Supreme Court, Appellate Division, Third Department. The land was found "subject to a public right of navigation, including the right to portage on plaintiff's land where absolutely necessary for the limited purpose of avoiding obstacles to navigation such as the Mud Pond rapids." However, New York's highest court, the New York Court of Appeals overturned the lower court decisions, and sent the case back to the trial court for consideration of "the Waterway's historical and prospective commercial utility, the Waterway's historical accessibility to the public, the relative ease of passage by canoe, the volume of historical travel, and the volume of prospective commercial and recreational use." The decision by New York's highest court established that recreational 'navigability' alone is not sufficient to prove that a waterway is a public highway in New York State. The US Supreme Court had also found that use of modern water craft insufficient evidence to support a finding of navigability

==== Examples ====
- Inland Waterway (Michigan)
- Intracoastal Waterway

=== Inland water transport system in India ===
In India there are currently three National Waterways totaling a distance of 2921 km. They are:

- Haldia-Allahabad stretch of the Ganges-Bhagirathi-Hooghly river system (1620 km) in October 1986 as National Waterway 1
- Saidiya-Dhubri stretch of the Brahmaputra River system (891 km) in September, 1988 as National Waterway 2
- Kollam-Kottappuram (in Kerala) stretch of West Coast Canal (410 km) along with Champakara canal and Udyogmandal canal in February, 1993 as National Waterway 3

It is estimated that the total navigable length of inland waterways is 14500 km. A total of 16 million tonnes of freight is moved by this mode of transport.

== Advantages of inland water transport systems ==
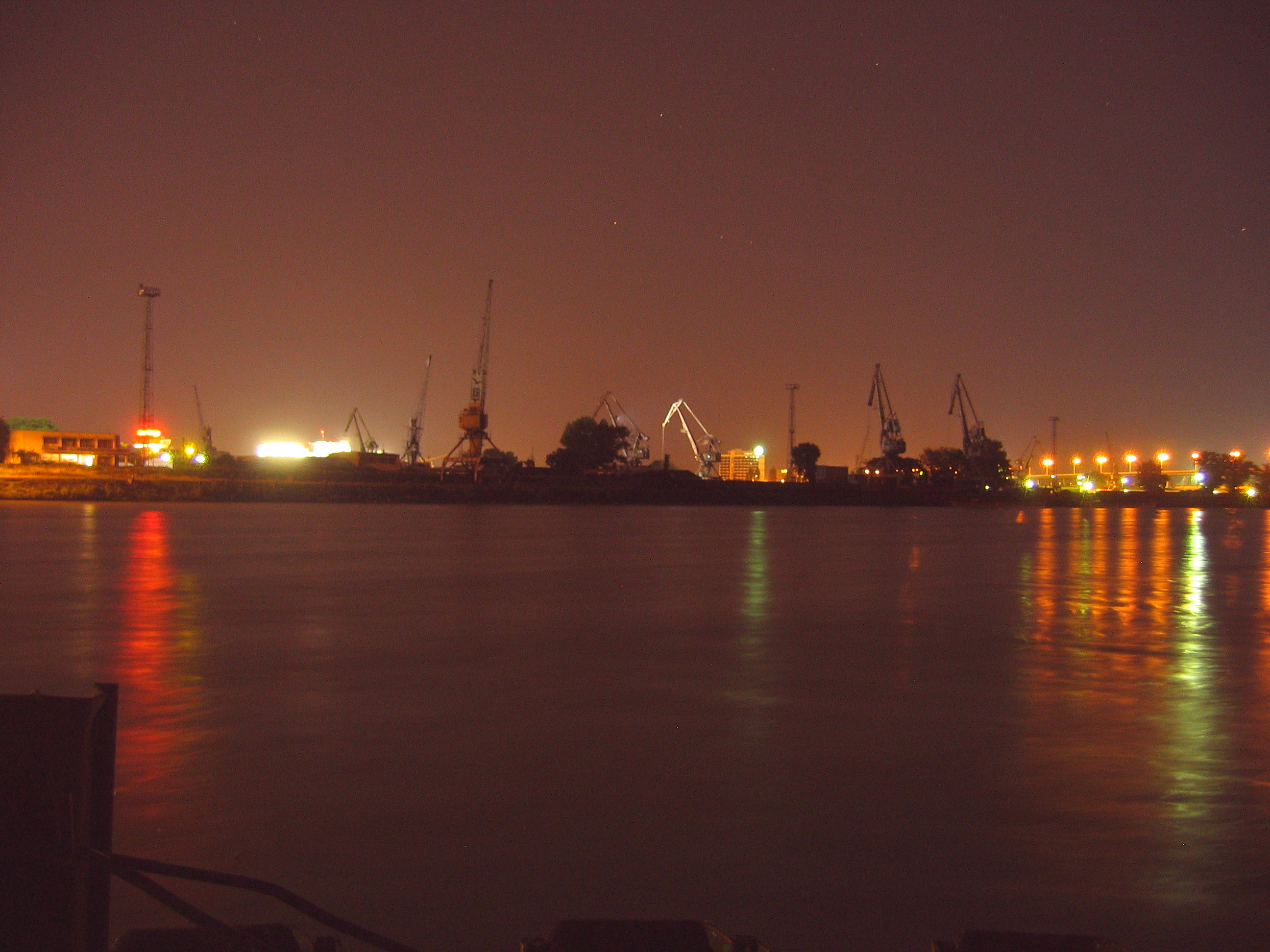
Port of Bratislava (Slovakia) at night

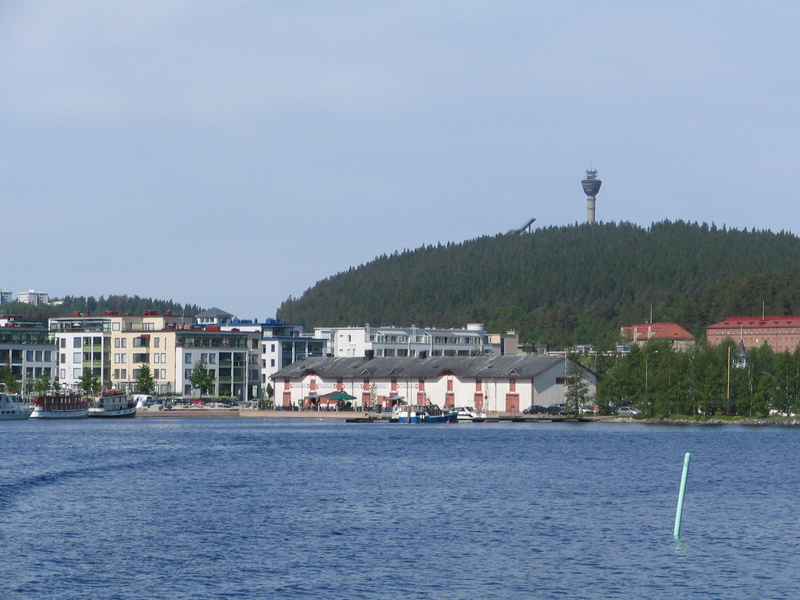
Port of Kuopio on the shore of Lake Kallavesi in 2005

Waterways provide enormous advantages as a mode of transport compared to land and air modes of transports.

- Cheaper capital cost – Nature has already done the initial engineering work for the transportation infrastructure, the cost of developing an inland waterway is 5–10% of the cost developing an equivalent railway or a four-lane expressway. This varies a lot, depending on whether the waterway is naturally navigable, whether only ports are needed, or whether a canal and locks are needed.
- Cheaper maintenance cost – The maintenance cost of an inland waterway is only 20% of the maintenance cost of an equivalent roadway. The main expenses associated with waterway maintenance include dredging and invasive species control.
- Greater fuel efficiency (low cost of transportation) for large freight – It is estimated that 1 liter of fuel can move 105 ton-km by inland water transport. Whereas the same amount of fuel can move only 85 ton-km by rail and 24 ton-km by road. By air, it is even less.
- Easy integration with sea transport – Inland water transport can easily integrated with Sea transport and hence it reduces the extra cost required for land-sea or air-sea transport interface infrastructure development. It also reduces the time taken to transfer the goods to and from sea transport vessels.
- Tourism – Inland water transport has the potential to play a role in the development of tourism, especially Eco-tourism.
- Safety – Undoubtedly, inland water transport is less risky as compared to other means of transport, mainly due to far less traffic and slower speeds.

== Disadvantages of inland water transport systems ==
- Low availability of inland waterways – As mentioned above, there are numerous criteria for a water body to be navigable. Out of the total inland water body available in the world, only a very low percentage of it is potentially navigable.
- Low speed – Water transport as a whole is much slower than its road, rail, or air competitors.
- Seasonal character of rivers – In extreme weather condition waterways may freeze or dry. Therefore, It would not be possible to carry out the transportation throughout the year.
- Flexibility – Inland waterways are less flexible like roads. Transportation can be carried out only with some fixed points, individualization or molding for public benefit is not possible.
- Navigability – Diversion of water for irrigation reduces river flow and further siltation breaks down the navigability very easily.
- Safety risks – Risks to human life and health most prominently involve drowning or, in cold waters, hypothermia, if a passenger or crew member falls overboard. Seasickness is a comparatively minor issue in turbulent waters. Risks to property include water damage and the much greater difficulty in recovering goods if a vessel sinks.

== See also ==
- Glossary of nautical terms (disambiguation)
- Inland harbor
- Inland sea (geology)
- Lake freighter
- Merchant vessel
- Ship transport
- Watercraft
