= Marshall Park =

Marshall Park may refer to:

- Marshall Park (Charlotte, North Carolina)
- Marshall Park, Portland, Oregon, a neighborhood in Portland, Oregon
- Marshall Park (Seattle, Washington)
- Marshall Park, Ontario, a neighbourhood in the city of North Bay, Ontario, Canada
- Dubuque Arboretum and Botanical Gardens

== See also ==
- Marshall M. Parks (1918–2005), an American ophthalmologist
- Marshall Parker (1922–2008), an American politician
- Marshalls Park Academy, a secondary school in Romford, London, England
