= Eric Banks =

Eric Banks may refer to:

- Eric Banks (composer) (born 1969), American composer, choral conductor, and ethnomusicologist
- Eric Banks (American football) (born 1998), American football player
