= J. B. Blunk =

American artist (1926–2002)

JB Blunk (1926–2002) was a sculptor who worked primarily in wood and clay. In addition to the pieces he produced in wood and ceramics, Blunk worked in other media, including jewelry, furniture, painting, bronze, and stone.

== Background and influences ==
James "JB" Blain Blunk was born in Ottawa, Kansas. He graduated from the University of California, Los Angeles in 1951 where he studied physics, later changing his major and studying under noted ceramist Laura Andreson. After serving in the United States Army in the Korean War, he met sculptor Isamu Noguchi in Japan and served apprenticeships with Japanese potter Kitaoji Rosanjin (1883–1959) and Bizen potter and Living National Treasure, Kaneshige Toyo (1896–1967). Blunk was the first American to apprentice into the line of descent of that country's great unglazed stoneware ceramic tradition.

After returning to the U.S., Blunk was eventually able to build his own home and studio near the Marin County town of Inverness, California, where he had a lifelong friendship and association with painter Gordon Onslow Ford.

== Work ==
Among Blunk's best-known and highly regarded public works is “The Planet” (1969), located in the lobby of the Oakland Museum of California. Writer Monica Quock Chan, in an article on the Oakland Museum, described “Planet” as follows: “In the entrance lobby sits a circular, benchlike sculpture 13 feet in diameter. Back in 1969, woodworker J.B. Blunk carved "The Planet" out of a single redwood burl, and it has been an icon of the museum for years.” Blunk created the sculpture from a two-ton piece of redwood with the help of then-apprentice Bruce Mitchell.

Glenn Adamson, writing in Woodwork magazine (October 1999), described “The Planet” as “an irregular, wildly textured circle, riddled with textural incident. The piece is unified by a rhythm of alternating jagged forms and restful, smooth shapes. The work has been called ‘one of the most touched pieces of sculpture you could find,’ and indeed it still serves as a play space, bench and oversized toy for visitors to the museum." Artist Garry Knox Bennett has said, “It’s a masterpiece. It’s an absolute masterpiece. Not only does it look good, when you see kids climbing on that and under it, you know it’s eminently successful.”

Two other works are “Magic Boat,” at the California Orientation Center for the Blind, and “Greens,” at Greens, the restaurant operated by the San Francisco Zen Center at the Fort Mason Center in the Marina District of the city. In his Woodwork article, Glenn Adamson described “Magic Boat” as a “cradle-like nine-foot square sitting area with a rhythmic series of round projections that beckon to the hand.” Adamson characterized “Greens” as “a feat of engineering as well as a tour de force of woodcarving," a complex installation consisting in part of a “vertical redwood monolith” and “an assortment of small, rounded tables and stools.” The entire work was cut “from a single 22-foot diameter stump of redwood.” Like Blunk's “other major installations,” Adamson said, “’Magic Boat’ and ‘Greens’ encourage a feeling of community through their circular compositions and inviting shapes.”

In 1988, Blunk collaborated with landscape architects Ron Wigginton and Rachada Chantaviriyavit on “Wheat Walk,” a project for the University of California, Davis, Arboretum. “Wheat Walk” was awarded first prize in an International Design Arts Competition. "Wheat Walk" has yet to be constructed.

Blunk's work continues to be exhibited in galleries such as the Landing Gallery of Los Angeles, Kate MacGarry of London, and Blum & Poe galleries around the world. His work is also offered at auction by firms such as Sotheby's.

Sculptor Isamu Noguchi characterized the contributions of JB Blunk as follows:

“I like to think that the courage and independence J.B. has shown is typically California, or at least Western, with a continent between to be free from categories that are called art. Here the links seem to me more to the open sky and spaces, and the far reaches of time from where come the burled stumps of those great trees.” “J.B. does them honor in carving them as he does, finding true art in the working, allowing their ponderous bulk, waking them from their long sleep to become part of our own life and times, sharing with us the afterglow of a land that was once here.”

From 1958 to 1962, Blunk, along with his then wife Nancy Waite, designed and built a redwood cabin by hand. The Blunk House as it is called, is located in Inverness, California. The home contains a wood and ceramic studio Blunk used to complete some of his now well known pieces.

== Legacy ==
From 2008 to 2012, the Lucid Art Foundation in collaboration with JB Blunk's family, created an artist Residency at the home and studio of the late JB Blunk in Inverness, California. The four-year Residency program served 18 national and international artists. Information on the Residency program may be found at the Lucid Art Foundation website www.lucidart.org.

Biographical information along with lists of collections and exhibits plus photographs of JB Blunk's work—and himself at work—may be found at the official JB Blunk website listed below.

== Selected exhibits ==
2022 'Three Landscapes: JB Blunk, Anna and Lawrence Halprin', Blum & Poe, Los Angeles, CA

2019 Dallas Art Fair, with Reform/The Landing, Dallas, TX

2019 'In Conversation: Alma Allen and JB Blunk', Nevada Museum of Art, Reno, NV

2019 'Ship of Dreams: Artists, Poets, and Visionaries of the S.S. Vallejo', Bolinas Museum, Bolinas, CA

2019 FOG Design + Art Fair, with Reform/The Landing, San Francisco, CA

2018 'JB Blunk', Kate MacGarry, London, UK

2018 Frieze New York, with Blum & Poe, New York, NY

2018 'Ship of Dreams: Artists, Poets, and Visionaries of the S.S. Vallejo', Sonoma Valley Museum of Art, Sonoma, CA

2018 'JB Blunk: Nature, Art & Everyday Life', Oakland Museum of California, Oakland, CA

2018 'Marin Collects', College of Marin Fine Arts Gallery, Kentfield, CA

2018 'Designed in California', SFMOMA, San Francisco, CA

2018 'In Conversation: Alma Allen and JB Blunk', Palm Springs Art Museum, Palm Springs, CA

2018 FOG Design + Art Fair, with Reform/The Landing and Blum & Poe, San Francisco, CA

2017 'Hippie Modernism: The Struggle for Utopia', The UC Berkeley Art Museum and Pacific Film Archive, Berkeley, CA

2017 'Chair Stories', Bolinas Museum, Bolinas, CA

2016 'JB Blunk', Blum & Poe, Tokyo, Japan

2015 'JB Blunk: painting, drawing, sculpture', the Landing, Los Angeles, CA

2015 'Art and Other Tactics', Museum of Craft and Design, San Francisco, CA

2012 Frieze Art Fair with Blum & Poe, New York, NY

2011 ‘Big A@# Sculpture Show’, Rena Bransten Gallery, San Francisco, CA

2011 'Crafting Modernism', Museum of Arts and Design, New York, NY

2010 'The Anniversary Show', SFMOMA, San Francisco, CA

2010 Frieze Art Fair, Blum & Poe, New York, NY

2010 Solo show, Blum & Poe, Los Angeles, CA

2009 SF20 Design Fair with Reform Gallery, San Francisco, CA

2008 Design Miami/Basel with Reform Gallery, Basel, Switzerland

2007 Design Miami/Basel with Reform Gallery, Miami, FL

2005 Solo show, Dance Palace Community Center, Point Reyes Station, CA

2000 Solo show, ‘California Spirit’, Bolinas Museum, Bolinas, CA

1999 Group show with John Anderson, Eubank Studio, Point Reyes Station, CA

1991 Group show, Claudia Chapline Gallery, Stinson Beach, CA

1989 Solo show, 'Sculptures, Ceramics, Stone, Wood', Smith Anderson Gallery, Palo Alto, CA

1986 Solo show, ‘A Sculptor’s Place’, San Francisco Craft and Folk Art Museum, San Francisco, CA

1984 Solo show of ceramics, ‘100 Plates Plus’, Oklahoma State University, Norman, OK

1983 Group show, David Cole Gallery, Inverness, CA

1982 Group show, American Academy of Arts and Letters, New York, NY

1982 Solo show of ceramics, ‘100 Plates Plus’ University of North Dakota, ND

1981 Solo show of ceramics, ‘100 Plates Plus’, Artspace, Los Angeles, CA

1981 Solo show of ceramics, ‘100 Plates Plus’, David Cole Gallery, Inverness, CA

1978 Group show, Galerie Schreiner, Basel, Switzerland

1978 Solo show, ‘Sculptures 1952-1977’, Craft and Folk Art Museum, Los Angeles, CA

1977 Group show, Gallery Paule Anglim, San Francisco, CA

1976 ‘Sculpture in the Bay Area’, James Willis Gallery, San Francisco, CA

1974 ‘Outdoor Sculpture’, Oakland Museum of California, Oakland, CA

1973 Group show, Lester Gallery, Inverness, CA

1970 ‘With These Hands’, ABC Documentary Film

1969 Objects: USA, Smithsonian Institution, Washington, D.C.

1965 Group show, Egg and the Eye Gallery, Los Angeles, CA

1958 ‘East/West Exhibition’, San Francisco Museum, San Francisco, CA

1956 Group show at the Oakland Museum of California, Oakland, CA

1954 Solo show, Chou-Koron Gallery, Tokyo, Japan

== Selected collections ==
- San Francisco Museum of Modern Art
- Oakland Museum of California
- Stevenson College, University of California, Santa Cruz
- Stanford University
- Objects U.S.A., Smithsonian Institution, Washington, D.C.
- Grubb and Ellis, Oakland, CA
- Weyerhauser Company, Tacoma, Washington
- San Francisco Zen Center
- State of California
- Lawrence Hall of Science, Berkeley, CA
- City of Thousand Oaks, CA
- City of Menlo Park, CA

== See also ==
- Guide to Architecture in San Francisco and Northern California. David Gebhard. Gibbs Smith Publishers, 1986. ISBN 0-87905-202-3
- The Maker's Hand, American Studio Furniture, 1940 -1990. MFA Publications. Boston, 2003. ISBN 0-87846-662-2
- The Life of Isamu Noguchi: Journey without Borders. Masayo Duus. Princeton University Press, 2004. ISBN 0-691-12096-X
- California Design: The Legacy of West Coast Craft and Style. Suzanne Baizerman, et al. Chronicle Books, 2005. ISBN 0-8118-4374-2
- Modern Americana: Studio Furniture From High Craft to High Glam. Julie Iovine and Todd Merrill. Rizzoli, 2008. ISBN 0-8478-3053-5
- Studio Furniture of the Renwick Gallery: Smithsonian American Art Museum. Oscar P. Fitzgerald. Fox Chapel Publishing (September 1, 2008). ISBN 1-56523-367-0
