= The Esoterics =

Vocal ensemble

The Esoterics is a vocal ensemble based in Seattle, Washington that performs contemporary a cappella choral settings of poetry, philosophy, and spiritual writings.

== History ==
The Esoterics was founded in the early 1990s by director Eric Banks for his Master's and Doctoral recitals in Choral Studies at the University of Washington. They performed for the first time in June 1993 at the newly established Seattle Art Museum. The group has performed over 300 pieces during its first 30 years of existence.

=== Polyphonos yearly competition ===
In 2005, The Esoterics announced the inauguration of its annual choral composition competition, Polyphonos, which awards three premiere commissions each year to a national composer, an international composer, and a young composer under 30 years of age.

=== Awards ===
In the 2000s, The Esoterics won an ASCAP award and Chorus America's award under the Adventurous Programming of Contemporary Music category.

== Discography ==
- Beata. Seattle, WA:Terpsichore (1997).
- Antiphonia. Seattle, WA:Terpsichore (1999).
- Elementia. Seattle, WA:Terpsichore (2001).
- Penitentia. Seattle, WA:Terpsichore (2004).
- Immaginosa. Seattle, WA:Terpsichore (2005).
- Sonettaria. Seattle, WA:Terpsichore (2006).
- Nottura. Seattle, WA:Terpsichore (2006).
- Mandala. Seattle, WA:Terpsichore (2008).
- Ru'ia. Seattle, WA:Terpsichore (2009).
- Ourania. Seattle, WA:Terpsichore (2009).
- Barber. Seattle, WA: Terpsichore (2010).
- Haptadama. Seattle, WA: Terpsichore (2011)
- Chiaroscura. Seattle, WA: Terpsichore (2011)
