= Roscoe Diner =

Diner in Roscoe, New York, U.S.

Coordinates: 41°55′51″N 74°54′33″W

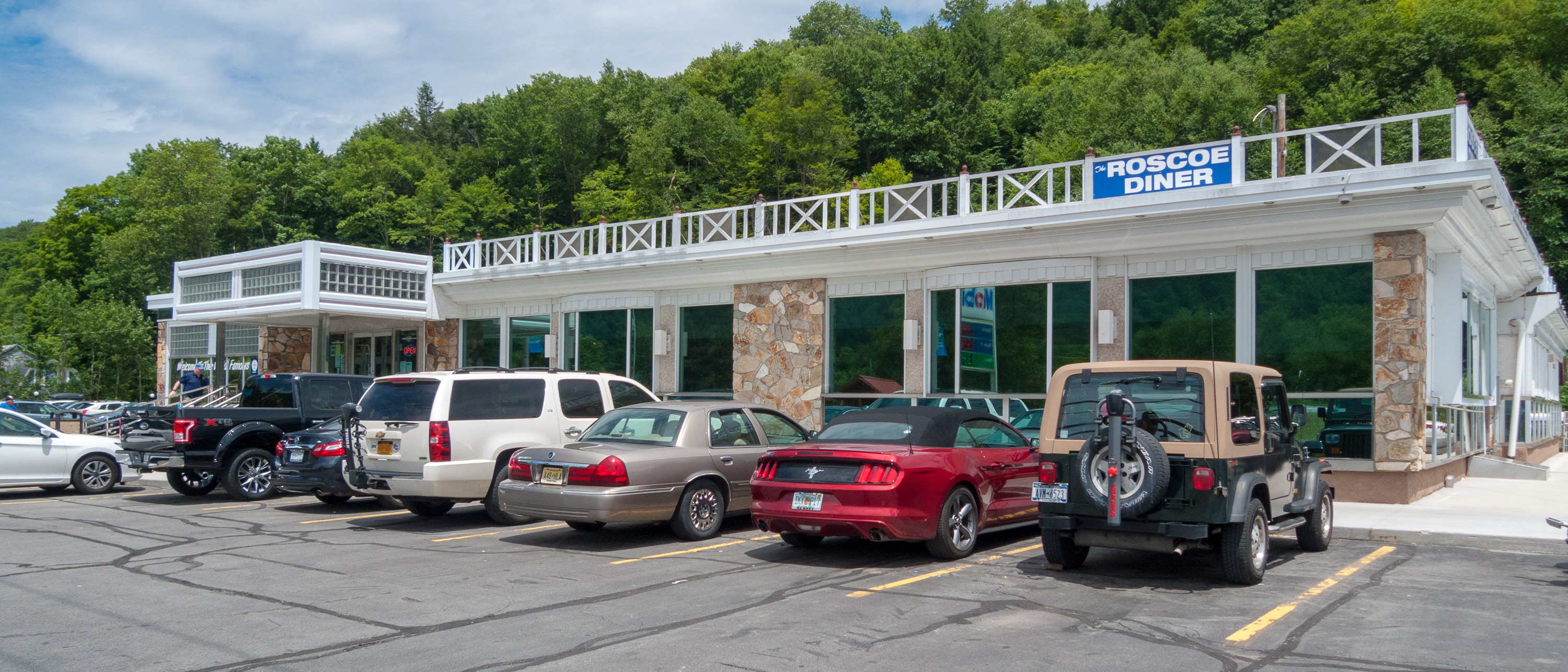
- Type: Private
- Industry: Restaurants
- Genre: Casual dining
- Founded: 1962
- Headquarters: Roscoe, New York, U.S.
- Website: http://www.theroscoediner.com/

The Roscoe Diner, located in the hamlet of Roscoe in Sullivan County, New York is a frequent stopping point for those traveling Route 17 between New York City and Upstate New York. The one-story diner with flagstone exterior is just off exit 94, the Roscoe/Lew Beach exit. It is a popular spot both for students heading to and from colleges in New York State, for flyfishermen as well as locals.

== Description ==
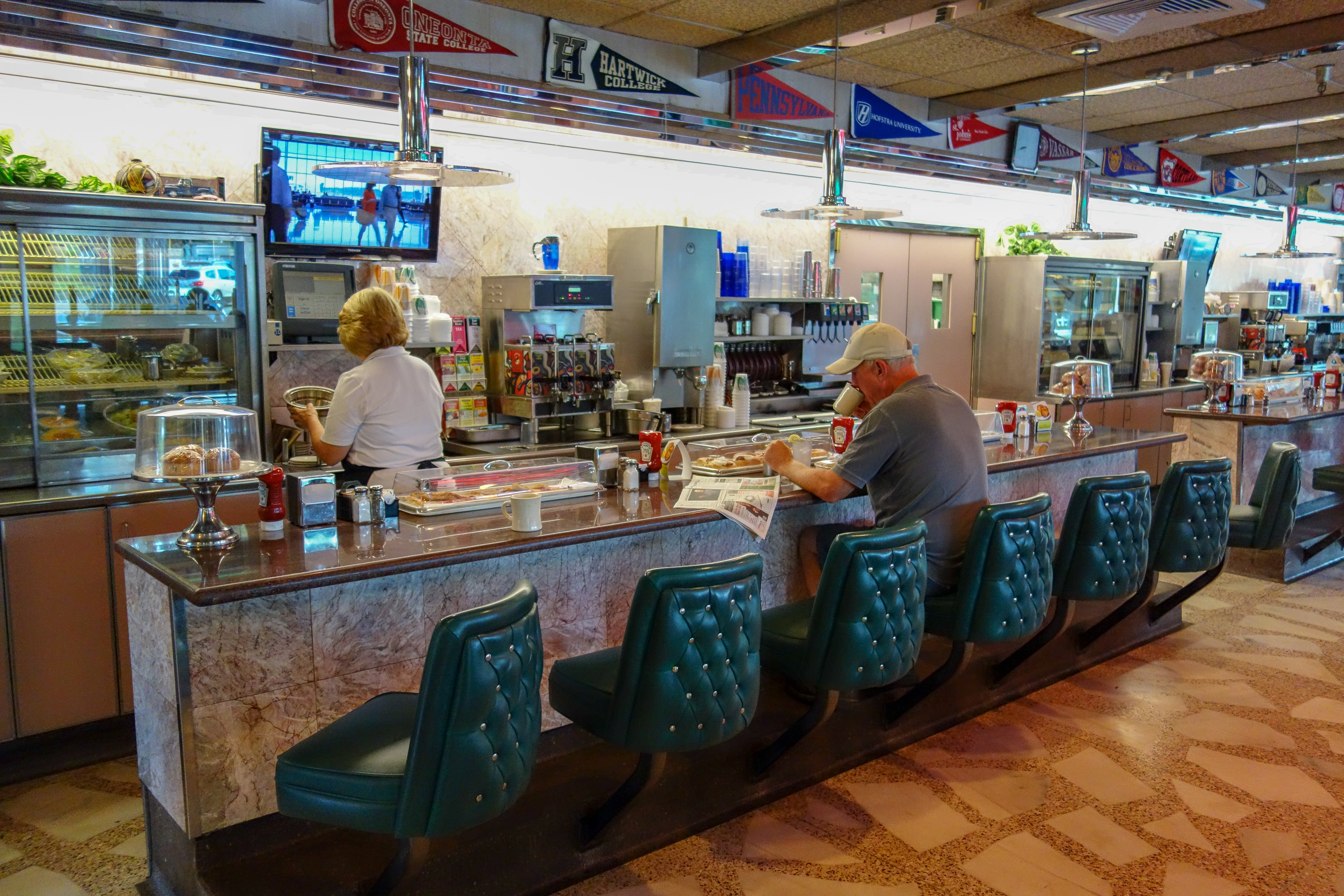
The Roscoe Diner counter

The Roscoe Diner was built in 1962 and is considered to be one of the busiest and most well known restaurants along Route 17. As of 2020, it is owned by the Niforatas family.

Although Roscoe is a small hamlet with a population of less than 500 at the time of the 2020 census, the diner served anywhere between several hundred and a thousand meals each day at its peak, leading the diner to declare itself "World Famous."

Customer numbers have declined in recent years due to a decline in trout fishing, the region's main draw.

The diner's signature item is its French Toast, featuring slabs of bread that are 1.5" thick. Breakfast is served all day, and meals are served on Syracuse China. Pennants from colleges in New York and across the northeast region decorate the walls.
