= Roscoe Presbyterian Church and Westfield Flats Cemetery =

Historic site in Roscoe, New York, US

- U.S. National Register of Historic Places
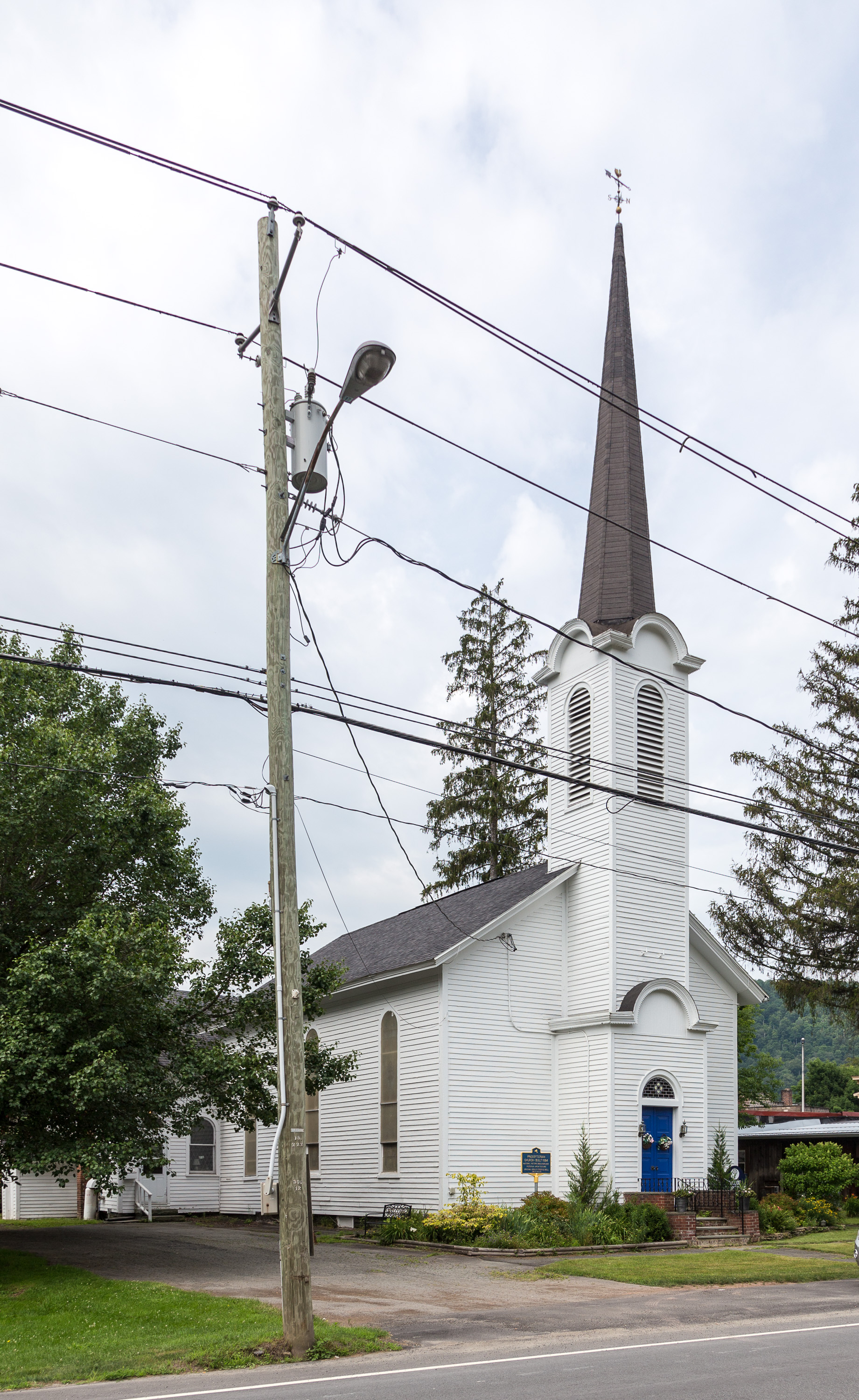

- Location within New York Location within the United States
- Location: Old NY 17, Roscoe, New York
- Coordinates: 41°55′56″N 74°54′47″W
- Area: less than one acre
- Built: ca. 1884
- Architectural style: Late Victorian
- NRHP reference No.: 01000574
- Added to NRHP: June 8, 2001

Roscoe Presbyterian Church and Westfield Flats Cemetery is a historic Presbyterian church and cemetery on Old NY 17 in Roscoe, Sullivan County, New York. The church was built about 1884 and is a simple rectangular wood-frame building, three bays wide and three bays deep, with a large rear cross-gabled wing. It features a narrow, engaged, center entrance tower surmounted by a spire. The cemetery contains about 200 burials, with the earliest dating to the first decade of the 19th century.

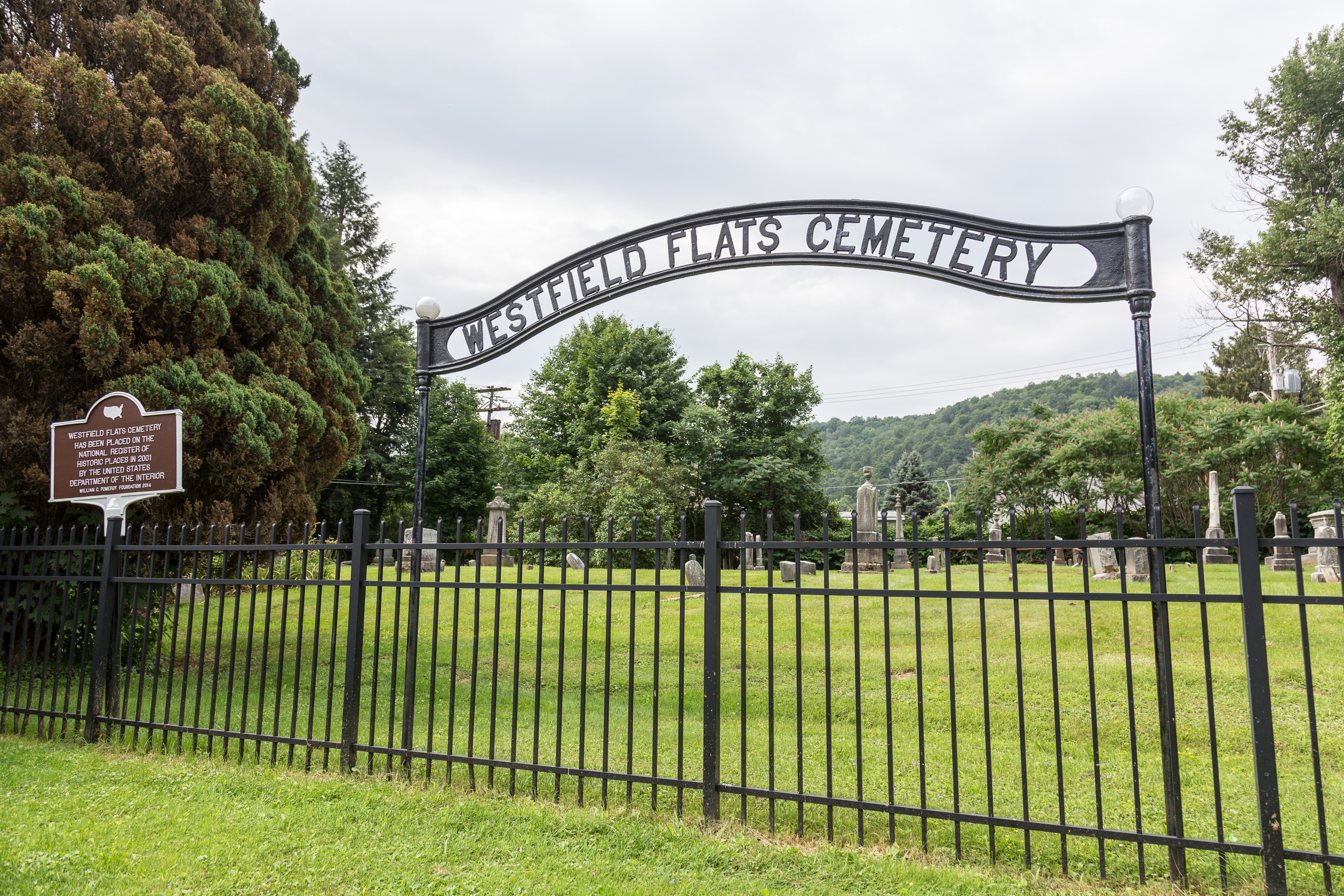
Westfield Flats Cemetery, Roscoe, New York

The church was spared during the 1916 downtown fire which destroyed 23 buildings. It was added to the National Register of Historic Places in 2001.

== See also ==
- National Register of Historic Places listings in Sullivan County, New York
