= Betty Bowen =

American journalist

Betty Bowen (born Betty Cornelius) (1918–1977), was an American journalist and art promoter. She was born in Kent, Washington, and earned an English degree from the University of Washington. She worked briefly as a reporter for The Seattle Times, and later as women's editor for the Seattle Star. She was married to John Bowen, captain of an AT&T ship that laid undersea cables.

Bowen played a role in founding the Seattle Art Museum (SAM) and many other important artistic institutions. Founding SAM Director Richard Fuller saw the potential in Bowen and promoted her to the first assistant director of the SAM. She is recognized for her successful attempts to make Pike Place Market a historic site, and her service on the board of the Friends of the Market. The Seattle Museum recognizes her service with an annual Betty Bowen Award, which recognizes formerly unknown artists from the Pacific Northwest and gives them an opportunity to win prizes up to $10,000.

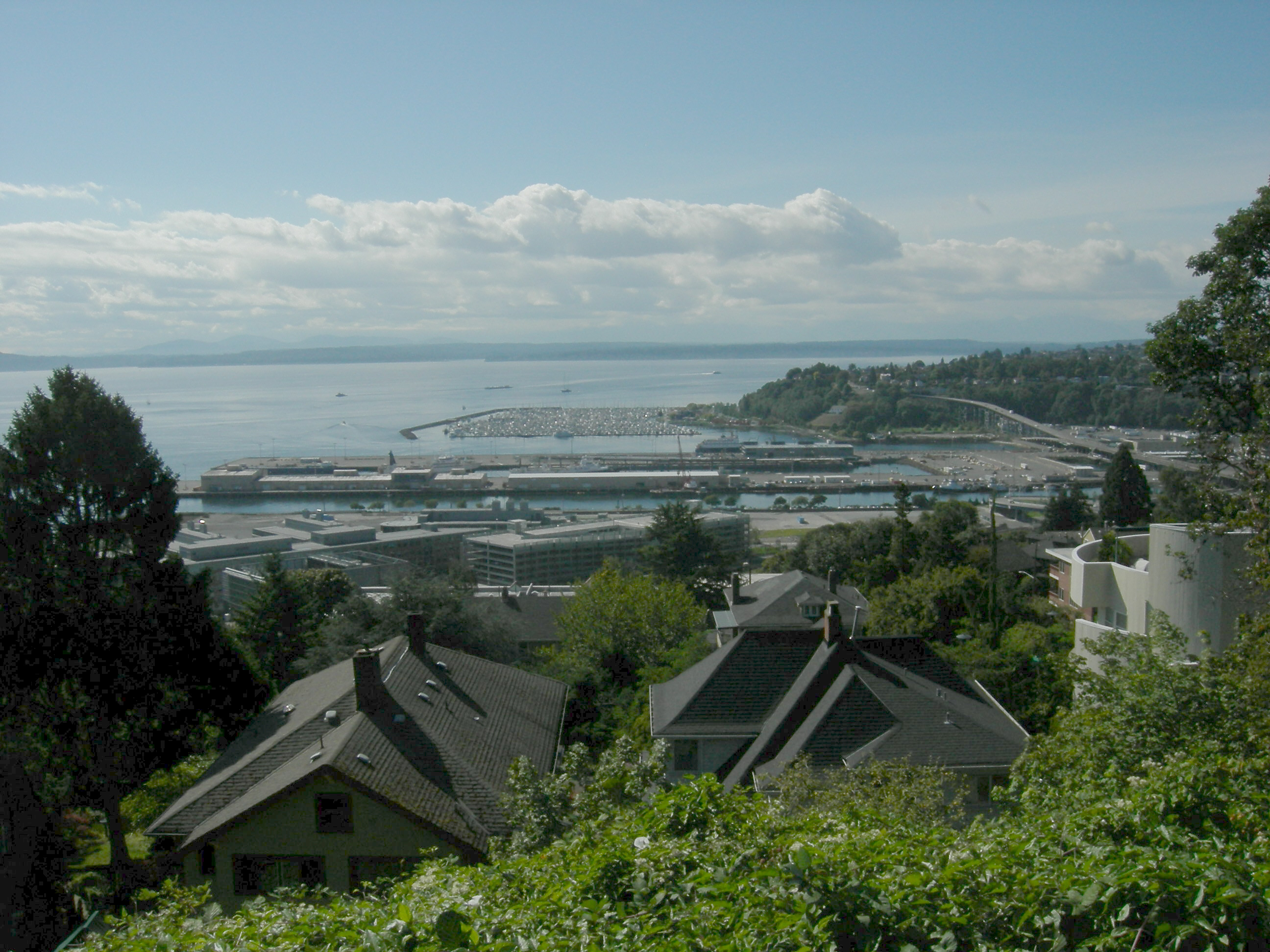
The view looking out to Smith Cove and Puget Sound from what is now the Betty Bowen Viewpoint, one block north (and uphill) from Bowen's home on Seattle's Queen Anne Hill.

Bowen was an original member of the Seattle Arts Commission, a founding member of the Pacific Northwest Arts and Crafts Center, and helped to found the Allied Arts Historic Preservation Committee, of which she became chair after its founding.

She died of a brain tumor in 1977 at the age of 58. She was declared a First Citizen of Seattle two days before her death.

Seattle Art Museum gives an annual Betty Bowen Award in her honor. The small Marshall Park, about a block from where she lived, features the Betty Bowen Viewpoint with a view over Smith Cove, Elliott Bay and Puget Sound. There are several unsigned works cast in the concrete walkway by the viewpoint; contributing artists include Morris Graves, Margaret Tomkins, Victor Steinbrueck, Guy Anderson, Kenneth Callahan and Charles Stokes.
