= Mud Pond (Delaware County, New York) =

Lake in Delaware County, New York, United States

- Location of Mud Pond within New York
- Location: Delaware County, New York
- Coordinates: 41°59′49″N 74°57′37″W
- Basin countries: United States
- Surface area: 22 acres (8.9 ha)
- Surface elevation: 2,051 ft (625 m)
- Settlements: Roscoe

Mud Pond is a small lake northwest of Roscoe in Delaware County, New York. It drains south via an unnamed creek which flows into Russell Brook.

== See also ==
- List of lakes in New York
