= Mud Pond (Sunapee, New Hampshire) =

Lake in Sullivan County, New Hampshire, United States

- Mud Lake
- Location within New Hampshire Location within the United States
- Location: Sullivan County, New Hampshire
- Coordinates: 43°21′05″N 72°04′46″W
- Basin countries: United States
- Max. length: 0.32 km (0.20 mi)
- Surface elevation: 1,119 ft (341 m)

Mud Pond, also known as Mud Lake, is a lake located near Sunapee in Sullivan County within the U.S. state of New Hampshire.
