= Ron Wigginton =

American artist and landscape architect (born 1944)

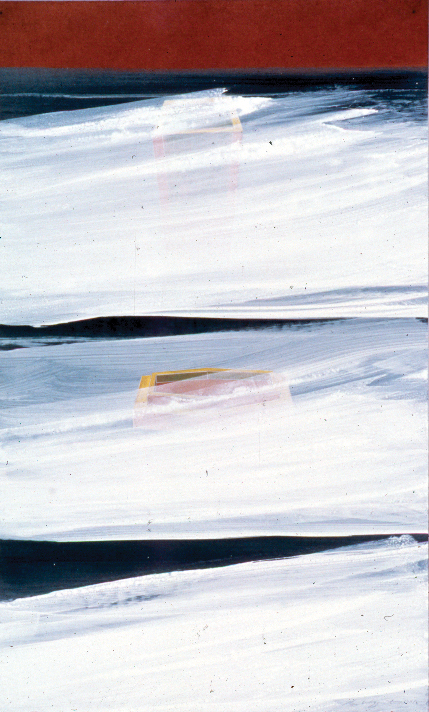
Sea Wall, 1981

Ron Wigginton (born October 1, 1944, in Oakland, California) is an American artist and landscape architect. His paintings and sculptures are held in West Coast museums and in private collections. His landscapes designs are noted for their narrative and aesthetic qualities, and his artwork typically involves and explores human perceptions of natural and built landscapes. Wigginton is regarded as an early practitioner among landscape architects to approach landscape design as a conceptual work of art, and his work has received international recognition through publication and awards.

== Education and influences ==
Wigginton graduated from El Cerrito (California) High School. He received a B.F.A. from the University of Montana and an M.F.A from the University of Oregon. As a young man he studied briefly with painter David Simpson, and in Montana he worked with ceramicist and sculptor Rudy Autio and poet Richard Hugo. In Oregon he met and befriended painter Charles Stokes, later sharing studios and exhibiting with him in Portland and Seattle. In 1973 he met sculptor J.B. Blunk, with whom he maintained a friendship and working relationship until Blunk's death in 2002. In the book San Diego Artists (1988), Wigginton tells of an early and ongoing affinity for Japanese culture which led to a hitchhiking trip through Japan in 1970. There he met Japanese potters and Living National Treasures, including Shoji Hamada, Fujiwara Kei, and others: “I was able to travel through the central spine of the country tracking down the ancient dragon kilns and meeting masters, very unusual people, very inspiring."

He returned to Japan in 1977 for an extended stay, establishing a painting studio close to the Mizumi Gallery in Tokyo and meeting international artists including Agnes Martin. On his return to the U.S., he settled in San Diego, where he studied with Niwa landscape master Takendo Arii.

== Painting and sculpture ==
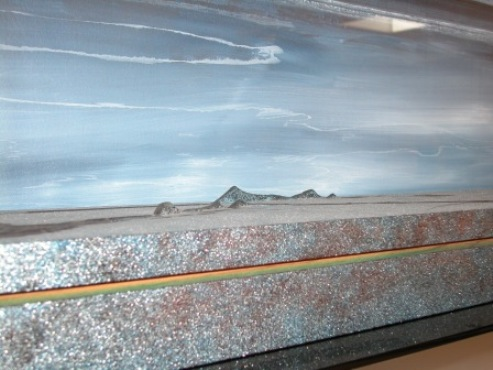
Mountains Into Rivers (detail), 1976-1981

During the 1970s, Wigginton taught painting and sculpture at Cornish School of the Arts in Seattle. Paintings and sculptures from this period and afterward are held in numerous private and public collections, including the Oakland Museum of California, the Portland Art Museum, Portland, Oregon, the Seattle Art Museum, the Museum of Contemporary Crafts, Portland, Oregon, the Center for Folk Art and Contemporary Crafts, San Francisco, the Rainer Bank Collection, Seattle, and the Museum of Northwest Art, La Conner, Washington.

Reviewing Source of Power, a 1981 exhibit at the Quint Gallery in La Jolla, California, Robert McDonald wrote in Artweek that the series consisted of “twelve works combining painting and sculpture," all “visual metaphors for physical and spiritual power, for nature and man. . . . The paintings are abstract landscapes, skyscapes, or simply atmospheres. The sculptural forms . . . represent both man-made, architectural forms . . . and natural, topographic features, such as mountains and oceans. Installed at eye level, the pieces are small worlds for exploration.” Elise Miller, reviewing Source of Power in the Los Angeles Times, noted that “the multifaceted process and sheer beauty of Wigginton’s art work are immediately intriguing” and that the “pieces reward on many levels. The more time taken, the more they are understood.” Thematically, Miller observed the focus on “power over death, power to create, spiritual power, and power as energy, from land, sun, water, wind, the atom.” But “rather than define sources” of this power, Miller wrote, “Wigginton seeks to expose human concepts about sources, as if he were a compassionate observer of all time and space, sitting on the edge of the universe.”.

== Landscape architecture ==
The founder of a landscape architecture firm, Land Studio, Wigginton entered the field following a decade as an exhibiting painter and sculptor. He is one of a relative few without a degree in Landscape Architecture to pass the state exam and become certified to practice in California. Wigginton founded Land Studio in San Diego in 1981 and after a brief partnership continued as the sole principal of the firm. Land Studio completed numerous projects in the San Diego area, many of which are open for public view, including the Union Bank Building Plaza at La Jolla Center One, the Nexus Technology Park, and the Linda Vista Library and Community Center.

Wigginton was the landscape architect for numerous college campuses in California, including the University of California, San Diego during the mid-1980s. Land Studio designed the site and landscape architecture for a new Price Student Center, amphitheater and fountain which also included the concept for the subsequent Library Walk (subsequently developed and implemented by Peter Walker's office), and the Molybiological Unit Two building sited and designed to create a campus-wide central pedestrian walk. Over the next two decades his work included campus design and implementation at San Diego Mesa College, Grossmont-Cuyamaca College in San Diego County, the Stanford University reservoir project in Palo Alto, and the precedent-setting work for Cabrillo College in Aptos, California.

Wigginton has continued his work in painting and sculpture throughout his career in landscape architecture. The introduction to his works collected at the Environmental Design Archives at the University of California, Berkeley notes that “Wigginton has been recognized for his art-informed approach to landscape design, continuing to work on art installations and paintings throughout his professional career." In the Illustrated History of Landscape Design, Chip Sullivan and Elizabeth Boults wrote that "Ron Wigginton was one of the first Landscape Architects to approach the design of a landscape as a conceptual work of art."

In honoring Wigginton as a Fellow in 2002, the American Society of Landscape Architects declared that Wigginton “has advanced the standing of landscape architecture through his exacting technical expertise in innovative design and sculptural form. [He] was the first landscape architect to use fiber optics in the built landscape (at La Jolla Centre Plaza) and to create exterior freestanding elevator corridors to solve complex ADA problems at Cabrillo College. He was also the first artist or landscape architect appointed a Resident Fellow at the University of California Humanities Research Institute.”

In “Places about Art, Places about Mind” (collected in Profiles in Landscape Architecture, 1992), J. William Thompson wrote that Wigginton “conceives of landscapes to awaken thought.” According to noted landscape architect Peter Walker, "he's not just doing pretty things. He has a strong sense of narrative; he has been trying to make landscapes which respond to a person's intelligence as well as visual sense." Rob Wellington Quigley, an architect with whom Wigginton frequently worked, remarked on Wigginton's "fresh approach to the whole discipline of landscape architecture . . . . He brings a fine artist's approach to the design process. . . . Ron's value is that he practices as a site-specific sculptor whose medium happens to be landscape. He is not burdened with any of the clichés of conventional landscape architecture."

Wheat Walk, Land Studio's design for an expansion of the University of California, Davis, Arboretum was awarded first prize in a 1988 NEA International Design Arts competition. According to Jory Johnson, writing in Landscape Architecture (January 1989), the jury noted particularly the aesthetic achievement of the design. The jury, whose members included the university chancellor as well as artist and professor Robert Arneson, wrote, "The winner, Wheat Walk, reconciles modern agriculture with its spiritual and vernacular origins. . . . More than the (second and third place winners), Wheat Walk belongs to the world of art. . . . The success of Wheat Walk lies in its sophisticated transformation of both Noguchi and Van Gogh.”

Architectural critic Sally Woodbridge wrote in Progressive Architecture (July 1989) that Wigginton “seeks to objectify [the] experience” of being “moved, elevated, transported” by the landscape. Woodbridge quoted Wigginton on one of his primary purposes: “I build platforms and bridges, places to sit and stand in order to intensify these moods.” Wigginton, Woodbridge said, “wants his landscapes to take hold of people and convert observers into participants.” Woodbridge emphasized Wigginton's focus on the time and place in which people find themselves. "I would never," she quoted him, "use a classical arch or any symbolic form that refers to some other time and place." Rather, Wigginton said, he wants people to "tap into that memory" of the landscape that has shaped their unique collective experience.

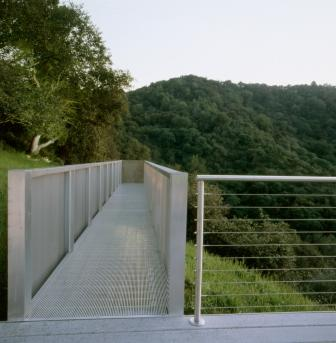
Moon-Viewing Platform, 1999-2001

In 1990 Wigginton relocated Land Studio to Berkeley, California. The firm completed several significant designs for public spaces. Vision Harlem was a conceptual study including drawings and recommendations for re-integrating culture, place, and history in the Harlem landscape. The study, containing ten illustrated site visions, was commissioned by the Harbor for Boys and Girls/United Settlement Houses and supported by the office of Rep. Charles Rangel but never implemented.

Projects completed in Northern California included Rutherford Square in Napa Valley, Communication Arts Magazine Headquarters in Menlo Park, Cabrillo College in Aptos, and New Orchard School in San Jose. In addition to public work, Wigginton designed landscapes for private residences in locations such as La Jolla, Del Mar, Saratoga, and Los Altos Hills. Among Land Studio's last public projects, still available for viewing in the area, are the site plan for the Marina Reconstruction of Jack London Square in Oakland, the Alma Place SRO in Palo Alto, the Berkeley Amtrak Rail Stop, and the site and landscape design concept for the new Berkeley Bowl Market. A majority of his work may be accessed through "The Ron Wigginton Collection" established in 2006 at the University of California, Berkeley, Environmental Design Archives.

== Academic work ==
During 1991–92, Wigginton was a Resident Fellow in a year-long symposium at the University of California, Irvine: The Continuance of the Classical Tradition in Architecture and the Humanities. In addition to his early years on the faculty at Cornish School of the Arts (Seattle), Wigginton has guest-lectured at several universities. In 1985 he served as guest lecturer at the University of California, Davis and California Polytechnic University, San Luis Obispo. He appeared as guest lecturer at the Southern California Institute of Architecture (SCI-ARC), in Santa Monica (1986), as featured speaker in the Design Lecture Series at the University of California, Berkeley (1988), as guest lecturer at the Rhode Island School of Design (1989), and as visiting lecturer at Stanford University (1995). In 1989 he was visiting lecturer in the Graduate School of Design at Harvard University and delivered a series of public lectures, "The Landscape as a Fulcrum for the Mind."

== Later activities ==
In 2007, Wigginton closed Land Studio's regular operations. Wigginton now maintains Land Studio on a consulting basis for site architecture. He continues to paint at studios in Berkeley, California, and near Yosemite National Park. His work is held in several private collections as well as the Computer History Museum in Mountain View, California. His painting "Birth Puzzle" was featured in the 2009 exhibit, "Dreaming: Selections from the Permanent Collection," and "Earth Forming/Logic Forming" was included in the 2011 exhibit, "Velocity," at the Museum of Northwest Art in La Conner, Washington In 2011, Wigginton was awarded a Morris Graves Residency Fellowship by the Morris Graves Foundation in Loleta, California. followed in 2015 by a solo exhibition of paintings completed in Morris Graves' studio, "from The Lake", at the Fresno Art Museum.

In 2016, Wigginton founded the 200 acre STAR Ranch in North Fork dedicated to the landscape arts. The following year he completed infrastructure and first land forming and began agricultural building design and construction with architect Rob Wellington Quigley. Completed in 2019, the Ranch complex included studio and art storage buildings. In 2020, together with his Landscape Assistant, Adam Casner, an East-West aligned "STAR-Viewing Platform" was built on the lower 40 acres.

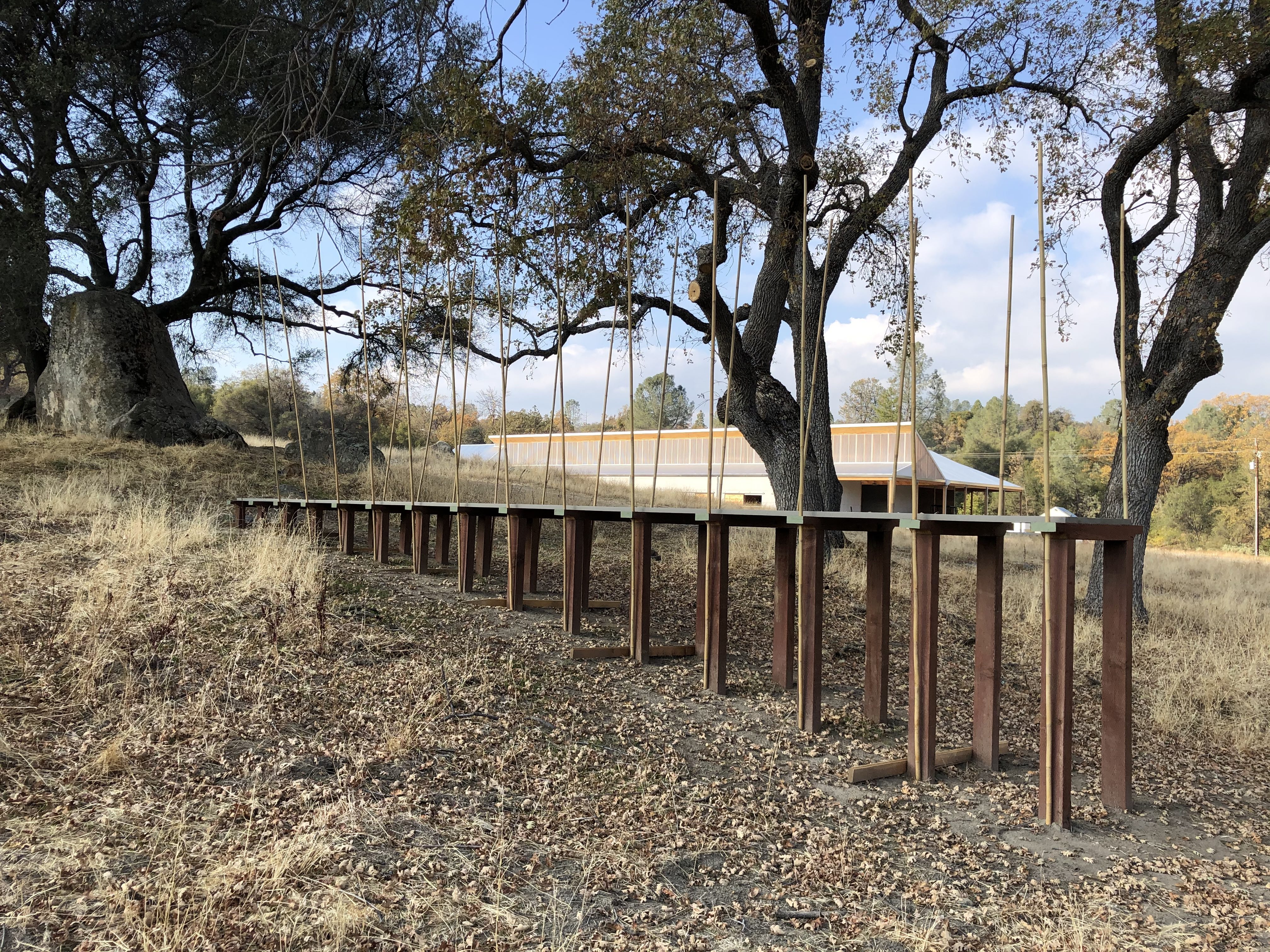
STAR-Viewing Platform at the STAR Ranch, 2020

== Selected exhibitions ==
- Artists of Oregon Annual, juried exhibition, Portland Art Museum (1972)
- 60th Annual Exhibition of Northwest Artists, Seattle Art museum (1974)
- Tsukubai, one-person exhibition of paintings, Foster/White Gallery (1974)
- Works On Paper, group painting exhibition, Seattle Art Museum (1975)
- First Illumination, paintings. Tokyo-American Club (1977)
- Source of Power series, painting and sculpture, Mark Quint Gallery, La Jolla (1981)
- City Forest installation at Quint Gallery, San Diego (1984)
- Landscape as Theater piece at the University Art Museum for “Celebrating 75 Years—Department of Landscape Architecture,” University of California, Berkeley (1988)
- Exhibit of landscape sculptures and lecture at the Corcoran School of Art Gallery, Washington, D.C. (1992)
- Exhibit of landscape paintings and lecture, School of Architecture, University of Arkansas, Fayetteville (1994)
- Silicon Sea, large canvas installed at the Computer History Museum, Mountain View, California (2005)
- Dreaming: Selections from the Permanent Collection, The Museum of Northwest Art, La Conner, Washington (2009)
- Earth Forming/Logic Forming, Velocity exhibition: Museum of Northwest Art in La Conner, Washington (2011)
- From The Lake, solo exhibition of paintings completed in Morris Graves' studio. Fresno Art Museum (2015)

== Selected awards ==
- Resident Artist, Dorland Mountain Colony, Temecula, California (1981).
- First Prize International Design Arts Competition for Wheat Walk project, University of California Arboretum, Davis (1988), with J.B. Blunk and Rachada Chantaviriyavit.
- San Diego/ American Institute of Architects Award of Merit for Forecast 80's StarWalk (1982).
- American Society of Landscape Architects National Merit Award for StarWalk project (1984).
- American Society of Landscape Architects National Merit Awards for City Forest and Visual Productions projects (1986).
- San Diego/American Institute of Architects Honor Award for Miraflores Residence (1987).
- Individual Grant for Design Innovation, National Endowment for the Arts: Design Arts, Carbon-Fiber Landscape Viewing Platforms (1993).
- American Society of Landscape Architects National Merit Award for Six Metaphysical Gardens, Escondido, California (1995).
- American Society of Landscape Architects/Northern California Chapter Merit Award for Alma Place/Palo Alto SRO (2001).
- American Society of Landscape Architects/Northern California Chapter Merit Award for Los Altos Hills Residence (2002).
- Elected to College of Fellows, American Society of Landscape Architects (2002).
- American Society of Landscape Architects/Northern California Chapter Merit Award for Castor/Packard Residence (2008)
- Residency Fellowship. Morris Graves Foundation, Loleta, California (2011)

== See also ==
- San Diego Artists. Robert Perine, I. Andrea, and Bram Dijkstra. Encinitas, CA: Artra Publishing, 1988. ISBN 0-936725-02-8.
- Experimental Architecture In Los Angeles. Aaron Betskey. Introduction by Frank Gehry. Rizzoli Press, New York (1992). ISBN 978-0-8478-1338-4.
- Profiles in Landscape Architecture. Edited by James Trulove. Landscape Architecture Publication, Library of Congress. Washington D.C. (1992). ISBN 978-9992521250
- The American Landscape. Christian Zapatka. Princeton Architectural Press (1997). ISBN 1-56898-093-0. Published in Italy by Lotus International as The Architecture of the New American Landscape (1995).
- Paradise Transformed: The Private Garden For The 21st Century. Gordon Taylor and Guy Cooper. Monacelli Press, New York (1996). ISBN 1-885254-35-0.
- Illustrated History of Landscape Design. Chip Sullivan and Elizabeth Boults. John Wiley and Sons Inc (2010). ISBN 978-0470289334.
