= Mud Pond (Morehouse Lake, New York) =

Lake in New York, United States of America

- Location of Mud Pond within New York
- Location: Herkimer County, New York
- Coordinates: 43°16′07″N 74°43′27″W
- Basin countries: United States
- Surface area: 8 acres (3.2 ha)
- Surface elevation: 2,018 ft (615 m)
- Settlements: Bull Hill

Mud Pond is a small lake east of the hamlet of Bull Hill in Herkimer County, New York. Little Metcalf Lake is located north of Mud Lake.

== See also ==
- List of lakes in New York
