= Roscoe, New York =

- CDP
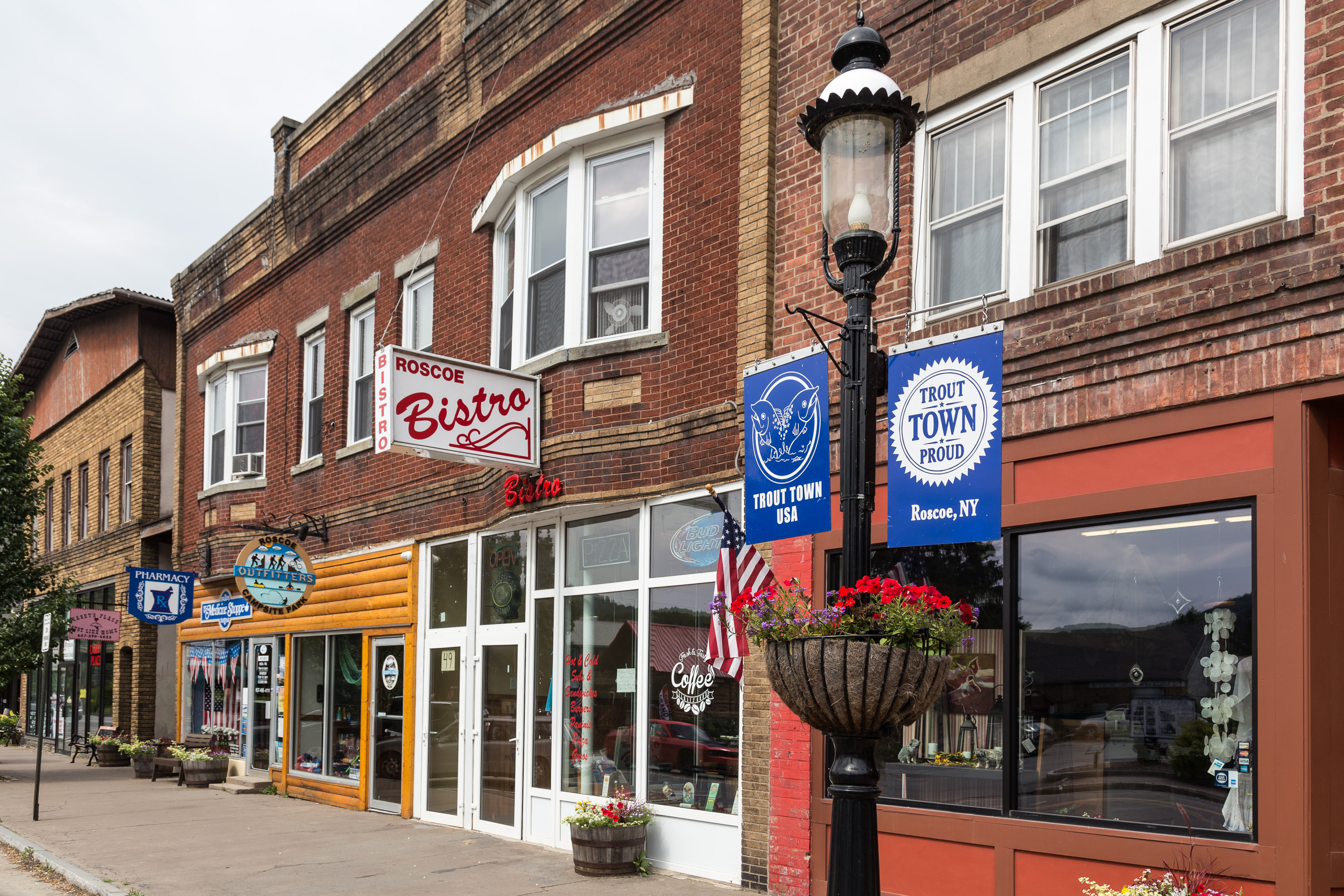
- Stewart Avenue is the main street of Roscoe
- Etymology: Named for Roscoe Conkling
- Nickname: "Trout Town, USA"
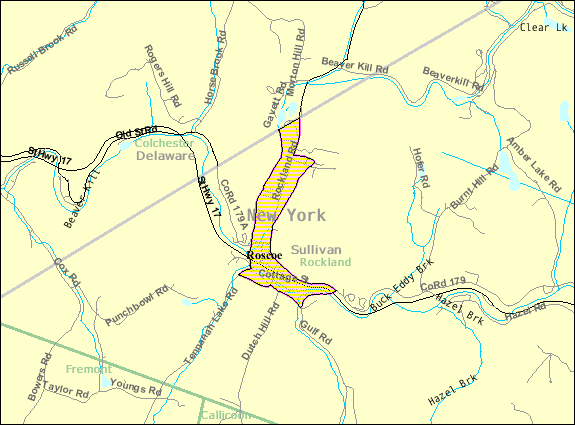
- U.S. Census Map

- Location of Roscoe in Sullivan County, New York
- Coordinates: 41°56′10″N 74°54′58″W
- Country: United States
- State: New York
- County: Sullivan

Area
  - Total: 0.98 sq mi (2.53 km^{2})
  - Land: 0.97 sq mi (2.52 km^{2})
  - Water: 0 sq mi (0.00 km^{2})
- Elevation: 1,296 ft (395 m)

Population (2020)
  - Total: 497
  - Density: 510/sq mi (196.9/km^{2})
- Time zone: UTC-5 (Eastern (EST))
  - Summer (DST): UTC-4 (EDT)
- ZIP code: 12776
- Area code: 607
- FIPS code: 36-63583
- GNIS feature ID: 0962895

Roscoe is a hamlet (and census-designated place) in Sullivan County, New York, United States. The population was 497 at the 2020 census.

Roscoe is in the southwest part of the town of Rockland, adjacent to New York State Route 17.

It is named for US Senator Roscoe Conkling of New York.

Roscoe calls itself "Trout Town, USA." The town is a destination for fly-fishing enthusiasts because of its location at the intersection of two rivers popular for trout fishing (the Beaver Kill and the Willowemoc Creek).

The community is a popular stopping point for people traveling along Route 17 (between New York City and Binghamton, New York) because the facilities are right by the access road to the highway. These include gas stations and convenience stores.

== History ==
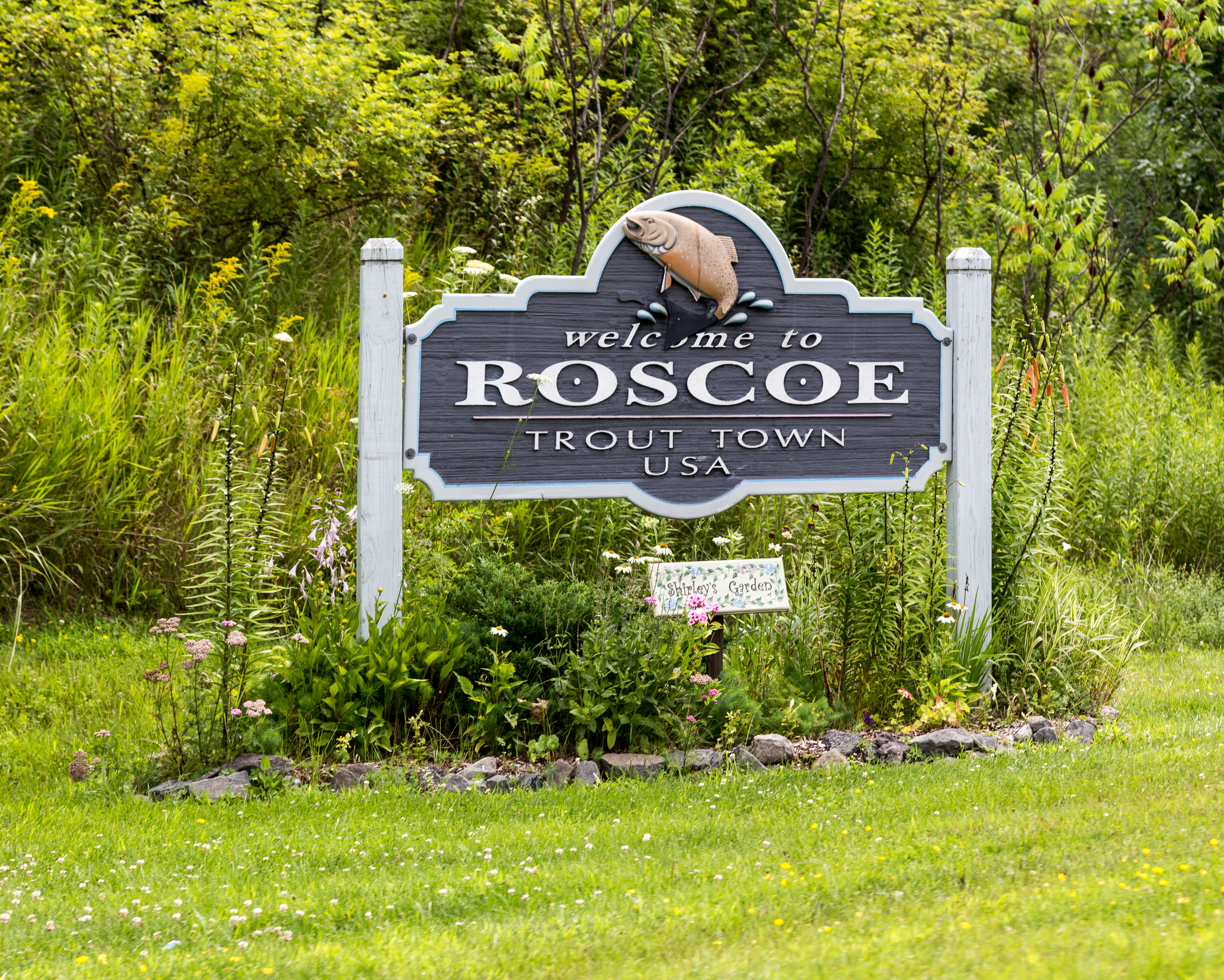
Trout Town

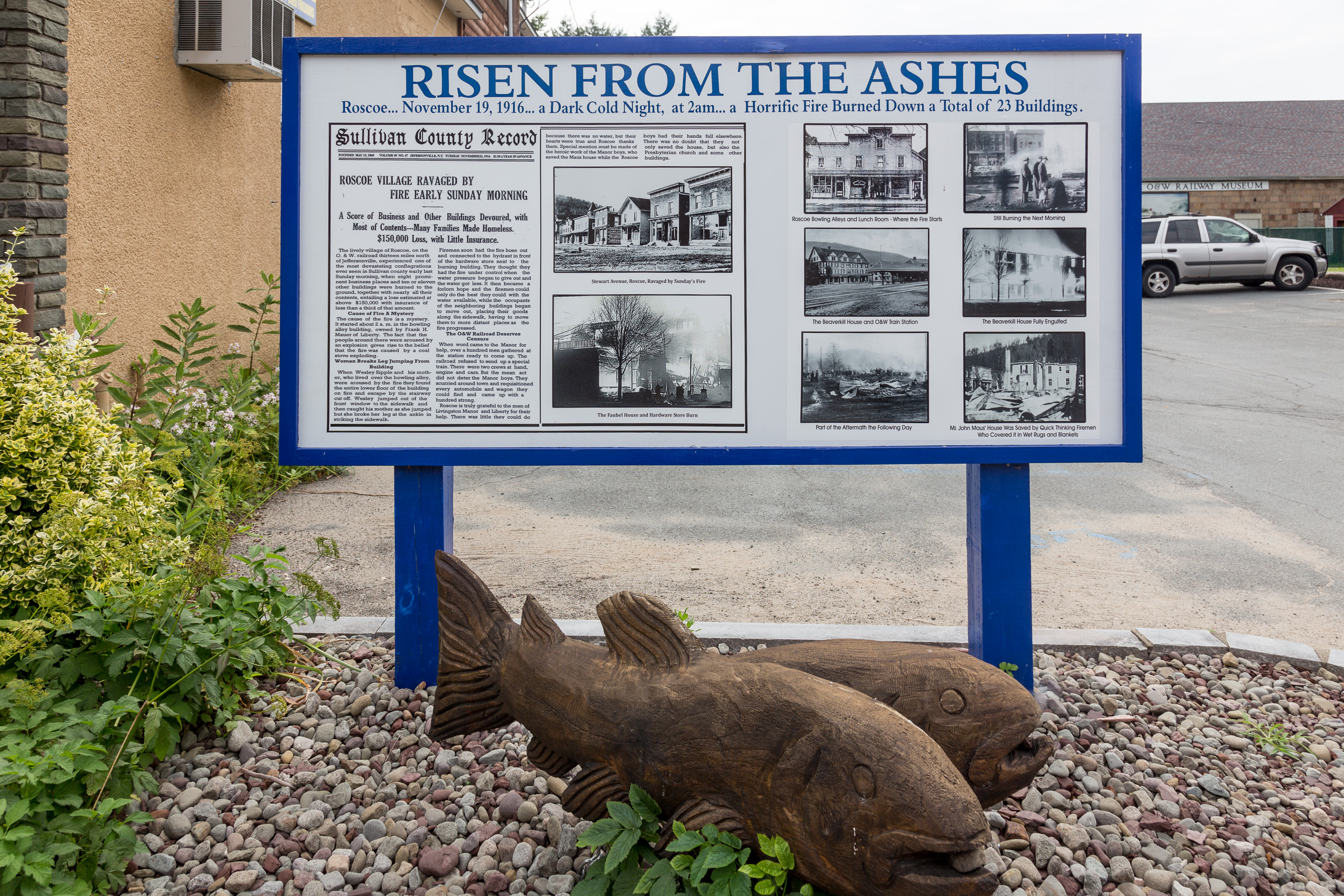
Historical marker tells of the 1916 fire.

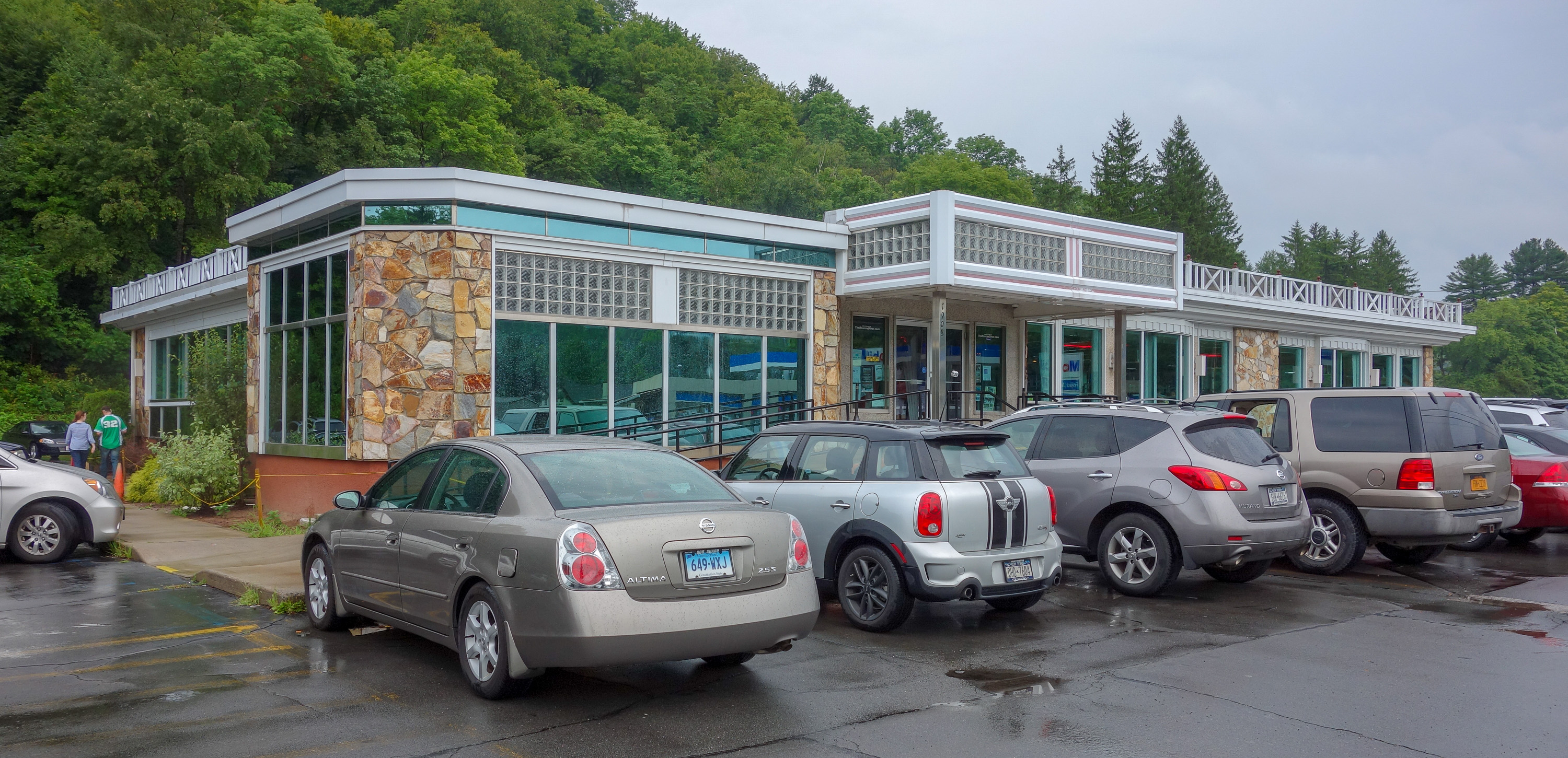
Roscoe Diner

In 1789 Roscoe was called Westfield Flats. It was the home of the Delaware Indians, where wolves roamed freely.

Roscoe, like most of the Catskills, was part of the Hardenbergh Patent in the early 18th century which in turn was purchased by the last Lord of the manor of Livingston Manor, Robert Livingston. The first settlers were brothers who bought the area around Roscoe from Livingston's son Jonathan Livingston. Stewart Street is one of the community's main streets.

On November 19, 1916 a devastating fire destroyed 23 buildings in town, mostly along Stewart Avenue. Over 100 firefighters came from Livingston Manor and Liberty to help control the flames, but after firefighters lost water pressure they were unable to do very much. The Presbyterian Church was spared.

During the construction of New York State Route 17 (Southern Tier Expressway), the section near Roscoe was one of the last to be completed, requiring travelers to exit onto the local truck roads for several miles.

Roscoe is a frequent stopping point for those traveling Route 17 between New York City and Western New York. The Roscoe Diner is a popular spot both for students heading to and from colleges in New York State and for flyfishermen as well as locals.

The Dundas Castle and Roscoe Presbyterian Church and Westfield Flats Cemetery are listed on the National Register of Historic Places.

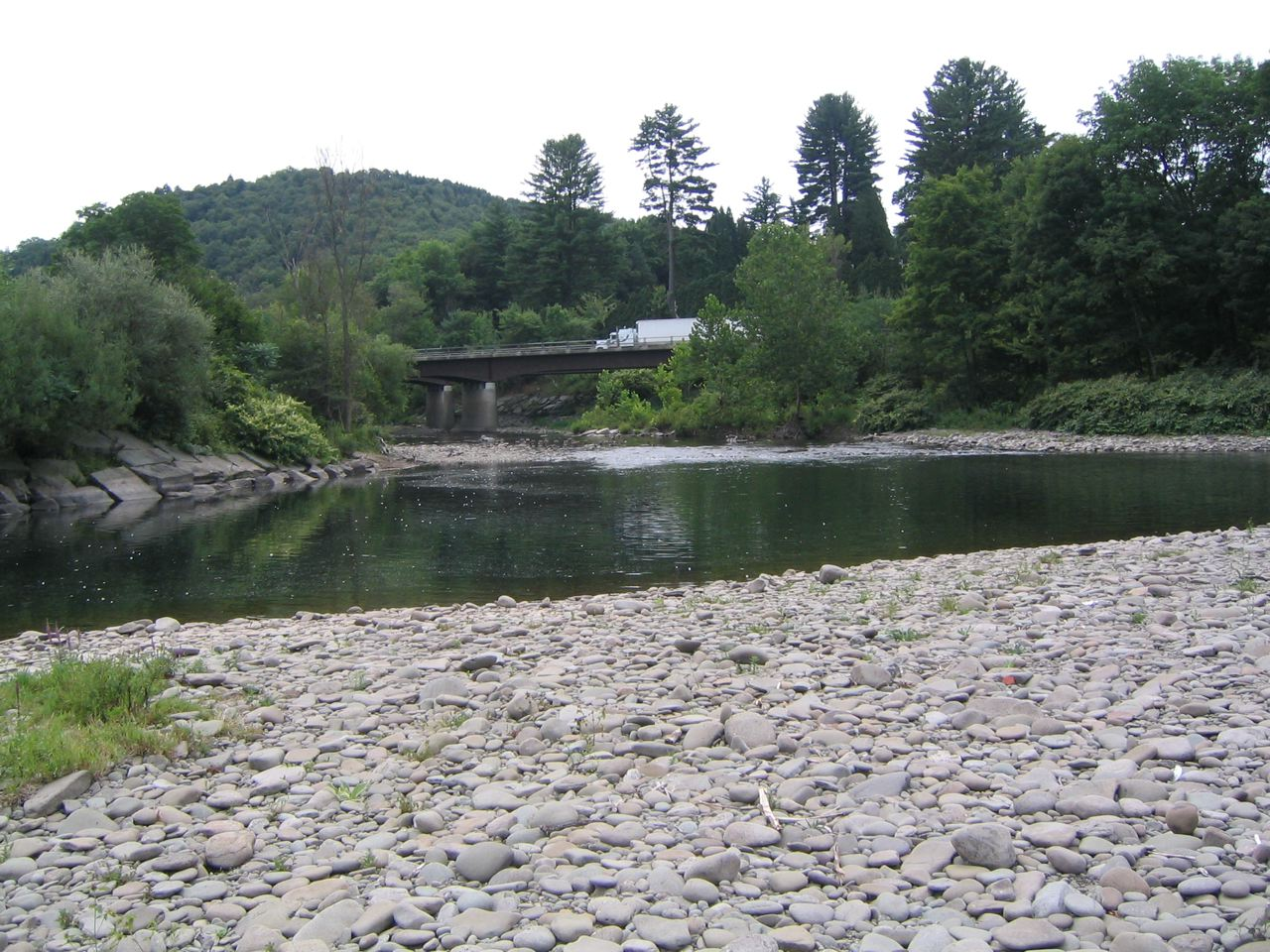
Junction Pool at Roscoe, August 2005

Despite being in Sullivan County, Roscoe is within area code 607 rather than 845 (originally part of area code 914) because an independent telephone company, known today as Citizens Telecom, furnishes the local service to Roscoe. This company also furnishes local service to the towns in neighboring Delaware County, whereas the adjacent towns in Sullivan County are serviced by Verizon, originally New York Telephone and later NYNEX.

== Geography ==
Roscoe is located at 41°56′10″N 74°54′58″W.

According to the United States Census Bureau, the CDP has a total area of 0.7 square miles (1.8 km^{2}), all land.

Roscoe is just inside the boundary of the Catskill Park and is at the junction of Beaver Kill and Willowemoc Creek.

== Demographics ==
Historical population
Census	Pop.	Note	%±
2010	541		—
2020	497		−8.1%
U.S. Decennial Census

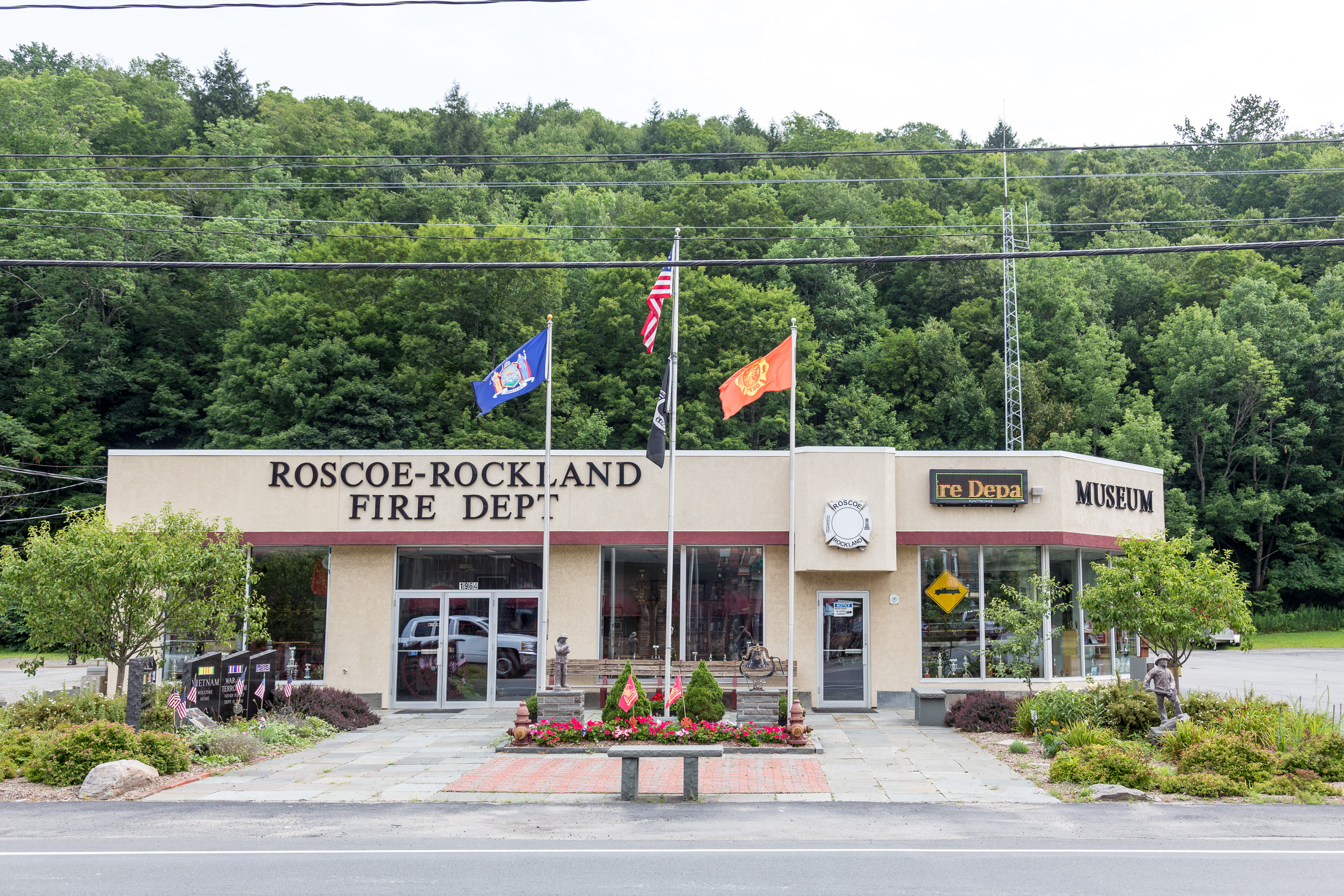
Roscoe-Rockland Fire Department

As of the census of 2000, there were 597 people, 261 households, and 157 families residing in the CDP. The population density was 801.6 inhabitants per square mile (309.5/km^{2}). There were 314 housing units at an average density of 421.6 per square mile (162.8/km^{2}). The racial makeup of the CDP was 95.14% White, 1.17% African American, 1.68% Asian, 0.17% from other races, and 1.84% from two or more races. Hispanic or Latino of any race were 2.01% of the population.

There were 261 households, out of which 28.0% had children under the age of 18 living with them, 46.4% were married couples living together, 10.7% had a female householder with no husband present, and 39.8% were non-families. 35.2% of all households were made up of individuals, and 19.5% had someone living alone who was 65 years of age or older. The average household size was 2.29 and the average family size was 2.96.

In the CDP, the population was spread out, with 21.8% under the age of 18, 7.4% from 18 to 24, 24.1% from 25 to 44, 23.8% from 45 to 64, and 22.9% who were 65 years of age or older. The median age was 42 years. For every 100 females, there were 88.9 males. For every 100 females age 18 and over, there were 89.8 males.

The median income for a household in the CDP was $35,625, and the median income for a family was $45,577. Males had a median income of $41,618 versus $19,500 for females. The per capita income for the CDP was $17,307. About 2.1% of families and 4.8% of the population were below the poverty line, including none of those under age 18 and 14.5% of those age 65 or over.

== Notable people ==
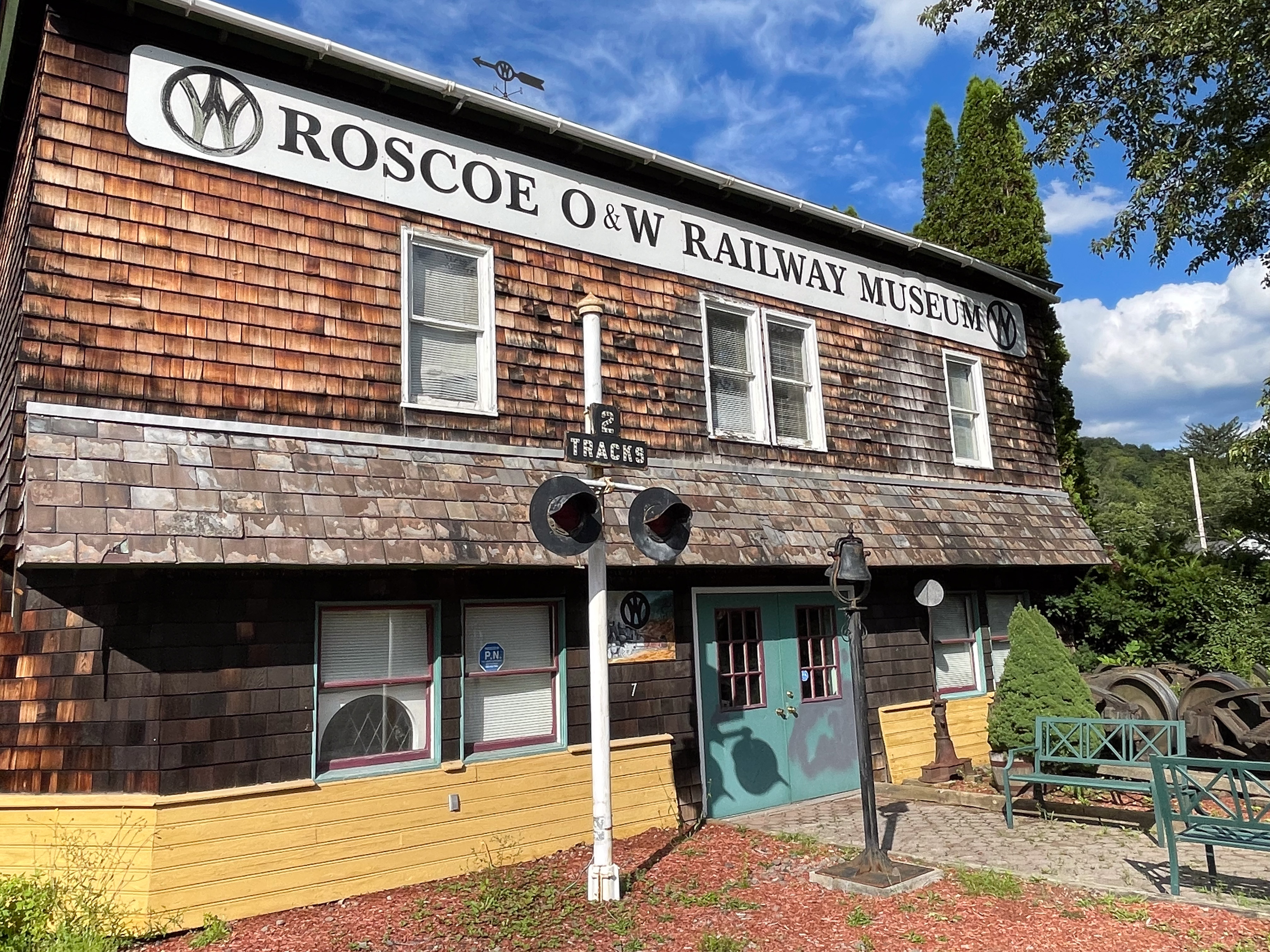
O&W Railway Museum

- Joan Wulff, "America's First Lady of Fly Fishing"
- Eric Banks, composer and choral conductor
- Russ Hodge, former American track and field athlete

== Notable attractions ==
- Roscoe O&W Railway Museum
- Tennanah Lake
