= Eric Banks (composer) =

American classical composer (born 1969)

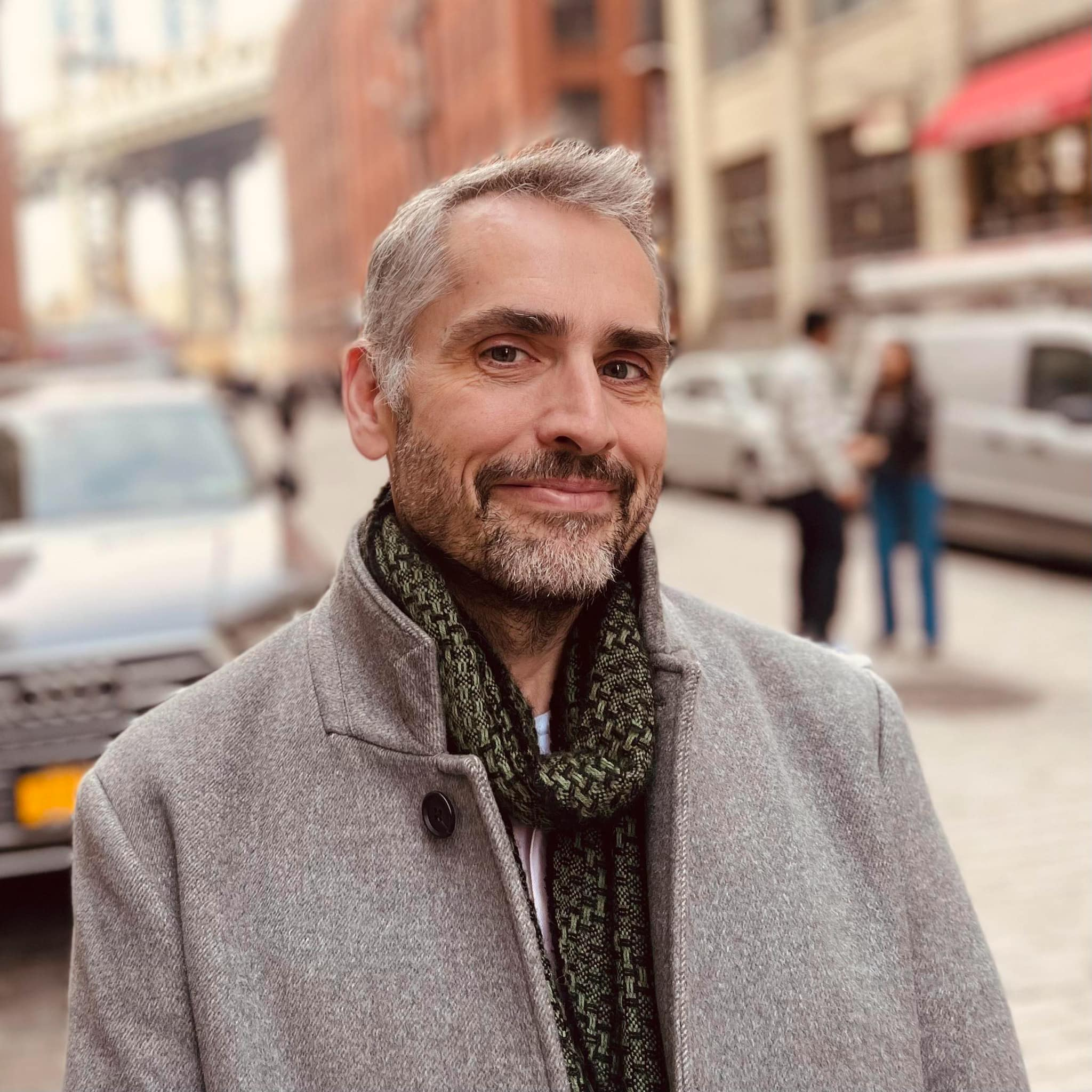
- Born: January 25, 1969 (age 57); Roscoe, New York, U.S.
- Education: Yale and University of Washington
- Occupation: Composer
- Website: ericbanks.com

Eric Banks (born January 25, 1969) is a Seattle-based composer, choral conductor, and ethnomusicologist.

== Life ==
Banks was born in Roscoe, New York, United States in 1969. He is the founding director of the vocal ensembles, The Esoterics and Ædonis. As a composer, Banks writes primarily for a cappella chorus. He is a polyglot and frequently sets texts in languages other than his native English, including dead languages such as Epic Greek and Avestan.

Eric Banks earned his BA in composition (1990) at Yale University, and his Master's and Doctoral degrees in Music Theory and Choral Studies at the University of Washington. In 1997, he was awarded a Fulbright Fellowship to study at the Royal Conservatory of Music in Stockholm; there he performed with several groups, including the Swedish Radio Choir and the Eric Ericson Chamber Choir.

In 1992, while still in graduate school, Banks founded the professional-caliber chamber chorus, The Esoterics, which performs rarely heard compositions of contemporary music for unaccompanied voices. The Esoterics has performed over 300 concerts throughout the Pacific Northwest, has commissioned and premiered over 150 new works for a cappella voices in dozens of languages, and tackles many of the most virtuosic choral works of the last century. The Esoterics has released fourteen CD recordings. In recognition for their efforts in choral innovation, Banks and The Esoterics have been honored four times with the ASCAP/Chorus America Award for the Adventurous Programming.

As a composer, Banks draws on foreign poetry, classical civilization, comparative religion, social justice, and natural science. As a composer and choral scholar, he has been awarded several grants: from the Arch and Bruce Brown Foundation (2005), 4Culture (since 1999); Seattle City Artists (2007); a composer's fellowship from Artist Trust and Washington State Arts Commission (2007); and three ASCAPlus Awards (since 2009). Together with The Esoterics, Banks has received two grants the National Endowment for the Arts, to compose, produce, and record concert-length works – Twelve Qur'anic visions (2007), and The seven creations (2010). In both of these works, Banks set melodies that he found in field research while traveling in Indonesia and India, including the Arabic tajwid (Islamic Qur'anic chants), and the Persian gathas (ancient Zoroastrian hymns). In the summer of 2008, Banks presented the paper Contemporary American Choral Music Inspired by Islam at the inaugural conference of Arab choral music, Aswatuna, in Petra, Jordan.

In June 2010, Eric was granted the Dale Warland Singers Commission Award from Chorus America and the American Composers Forum to compose This delicate universe, a cantata based on climate-change statistics, for the choral ensemble Conspirare in Austin. He currently holds commissions from the Boston Children's Chorus, Cantori New York, Clerestory, Kitka, the University of the Philippines Madrigal Singers, Seattle Opera, the SYC Ensemble Singers, and Voces Nordicæ. Eric taught music theory, music history, musicianship, composition, and voice at Cornish College of the Arts from 2004 to 2012, and has been a visiting scholar at the Cama Oriental Institute in Mumbai, India.
