= Todd McHatton =

American singer

- Website: mchatton.com

Todd McHatton (Todd Martin McHatton) is an American singer, songwriter, musician, performer, artist, and puppeteer. He gained notoriety with his hit kids song, “I Think I’m a Bunny.”

McHatton has released four solo albums: Grass Stained Twilight (2009), Sundays at the Rocket Park (2010), Galactic Champions of Joy (2011), and Todd McHatton Presents Marvy Monstone’s Mysterious Fun Time Dream Band (2012).

His second album, Sundays at the Rocket Park, was picked as one of Time Out New York Kids Top Ten Albums of 2010. His third album, Galactic Champions of Joy, was again named one of Time Out New York Kids Top 10 Albums of 2011 and the Out With The Kid's #1 Album for 2011. This album featured the hit song “I Think I’m a Bunny” which reached and held the #1 spot on the Sirius XM Kids Place Live charts for five weeks, and remained in their 13 under 13 for 35 weeks.

== Biography ==
McHatton grew up in Puyallup, Washington and at age eight, began to write music and play guitar, piano, bass and drums. He received formal musical training from the Cornish College of the Arts in Seattle, Washington. He moved to Los Angeles in 1987 and attended the Musicians Institute in Hollywood, California where he graduated in 1989. During that time, he studied with guitarists Paul Gilbert, Scott Henderson, and Frank Gambale. In 1987, he placed as one of the top 10 undiscovered guitarists in Southern California in the West LA Music contest. I Think I'm A Bunny.

In 1989, McHatton played with the Los Angeles underground pop band Alice I Wonder. In 1990, he was a founding member and guitarist for the psychedelic group Sun and performed on the Sunset Strip, headlining clubs such as The Whisky-a-Go-Go, The Roxy and Coconut Teaszer.

He collaborated in 1992 with “The King of Surf Guitar” Dick Dale and illustrated the children's book titled “Dick Dale’s Tale of a Whale.”

In 2008, McHatton published Grass Stained Twilight, a book of songs, illustrations and poems. The album Grass Stained Twilight followed in 2009.

He also released a holiday-themed downloadable EP titled “Christmas Songs” in 2009 that featured the track, “A Christmas Song for Harry Nilsson” which spawned an underground following of Harry Nilsson fans.

In 2010, Sundays at the Rocket Park was released. The Dallas Morning News compared McHatton to the likes of Harry Nilsson, Weezer, Electric Light Orchestra, Paul McCartney, Stone Temple Pilots, and "I Am the Walrus"-era Beatles, among others, and wrote that he “creates his own unique brand of driving, swirling, and super catchy pop music full of imaginative characters.”

In 2011, he released the album Galactic Champions of Joy and received critical acclaim with the release of the track “I Think I’m a Bunny.” The song features his daughter, Hazel, and his puppet, Marvy Monstone. Out With the Kids wrote, “Musically speaking, the songs on Galactic Champions of Joy unabashedly wear their master's Harry Nilsson/Beatles/impeccably crafted psychedelic pop influences on their sleeves.”

The video for the song, "I Think I'm a Bunny" on YouTube has over 230,000 views.

In April 2012, McHatton performed “I Think I’m a Bunny” live with Chris Ballew, who performs as a children's artist under the pseudonym Caspar Babypants, at the Sirius-XM studios in New York City as a part of a collaborative event featuring kindie rock artists such as Recess Monkey, The Okee Dokee Brothers, Secret Agent 23 Skidoo and Lunch Money. A new Marvy puppet crafted by James Wojtal, a puppet fabricator and designer who worked for the Jim Henson Company, made its debut. The event was held during Kindiefest 2012 in Brooklyn, NY.

In September 2012, McHatton released “Todd McHatton presents Marvy Monstone’s Mysterious Fun Time Dream Band". The album features Hazel McHatton and a cast of original characters created by McHatton. The album was described by Warren Truitt of about.com as a "Sgt. Pepper's Lonely Hearts Club Band for kids." The album was also named one of the "Top 10 Family Albums of 2012" by both Red Tricycle and Out With The Kids.

McHatton's songs “Happy Birthday Harry” and “A Christmas Song for Harry Nilsson” were featured on the 2011 Harry Nilsson tribute compilation along with Ringo Starr, Eric Idle and Paul Williams.

McHatton records all of his music in his solar-powered home studio. He plays all of the instruments, writes all of the music, and does all of the mastering, distribution, album artwork and video production for his solo projects. He is also a crafter of puppets and a puppeteer.

=== Recent work ===
McHatton began playing guitar for the band Pete in 2012. The band is composed of the duo John Mace and Scott Rabin, former members of the band Sun. Pete composes and records music featured on the hit TNT television show “Franklin and Bash.”

McHatton also collaborates with Morgan Taylor, who performs as a children's artist under the pseudonym Gustafer Yellowgold, Together, they formed the band Underbirds. Their new album is scheduled for release on April 26, 2013. Their world premier live concert/record release party will take place on April 27, 2013, at Symphony Space in New York City's Upper West Side.

== Discography ==
- Grass Stained Twilight (2008)
- Christmas Songs EP (2009)
- Sundays at the Rocket Park (2010)
- Galactic Champions of Joy (2011)
- Todd McHatton Presents Marvy Monstone's Mysterious Fun Time Dream Band (2012)
- Underbirds (2013)
