= Charles Stokes (artist) =

American painter

Charles Stokes (1944–2008) was a painter and sculptor and a prominent member of the last generation of artists identified with the Northwest School. He was the first winner of the prestigious Betty Bowen Award in concert with the Seattle Art Museum in 1979. His works are held by Northwest museums and institutions, most prominently the Museum of Northwest Art in La Conner, Washington, and by numerous private collectors. Revered as an energetic, charismatic, original, and meticulous artist and teacher, he spent his final two decades in self-imposed isolation from the art world producing works seen only by intimates. Stokes was born in Tacoma, Washington. He lived and worked in the Northwest until the early 1990s, when he settled in Manhattan, New York City.

== Education ==
Born in Tacoma, Washington, Charles Stokes received a B.F.A. from Central Washington University and an M.F.A. from the University of Oregon.

== Teaching ==
Charles Stokes taught at Cornish School of the Arts in Seattle, Washington 1969-1985. Among his colleagues were painters Albert Fisher and Ron Wigginton. According to art critic Regina Hackett, writing in the Seattle Post-Intelligencer, Stokes “impressed students with his formidable technique, experimental attitude and commitment to his craft.”

== Art ==
Writing about Stokes in the Seattle Times, art critic Sheila Farr said, “It's hard to think of a Northwest artist more gifted, mercurial and omnivorously creative than former Cornish College of the Arts instructor Charles Stokes. Or one whose style had a greater influence on his students. . . . Art for Mr. Stokes was like spontaneous combustion. He painted, drew, made music, invented his own musical instruments, wrote poetry, made sculptures out of whatever material was at hand.”

Untitled abstract watercolor, 1970-83, Charles Stokes

Commenting on the uniqueness of Stokes’ work, former colleague Albert Fisher said, "Nobody was doing anything like it. He had an iconography that included the unseen things of the world.” Stokes’ early work, Sheila Farr wrote, “put him at the forefront of the younger Northwest ‘mystics.’ You could make a case connecting his work to Leo Kenney, Mark Tobey and Morris Graves, but his style and imagery could be so fresh and imaginative that there was no mistaking it for anyone else's.”

Painter and ceramic sculptor Charles Krafft told critic Regina Hackett that (in Hackett’s words) “Stokes took Mark Tobey's system of abstraction, known as white writing, and made it three-dimensional.” Stokes, Krafft said, “was it, the last heir to the Northwest tradition. . . . If you couch it in terms of prizefighting, he got the crown. I think the world of him."

In Seattle, Stokes painted primarily in watercolors and gouache, an opaque watercolor. He also used acrylic, particularly in his later work in Manhattan. Painter Albert Fisher said of his technique, "What a watercolor painter: He could really make the paint flow!” Collector William Merchant Pease, an attorney in Seattle, “owns close to 70 of Stokes' paintings, mostly works on paper in watercolor and gouache,“ according to Regina Hackett. Pease told Hackett, "He'd use long-fiber mulberry paper with English etching embossed into it, made stiff as canvas with arrowroot and a drop of formaldehyde. “ Stokes," Pease said, “was magic.”

Stokes was known for his meticulous and exacting technique. In Regina Hackett’s words, “Stokes would draw first in pencil and then paint in layers, with gouache on top. Gradually, he made them bigger and bigger. Some took four or five months to complete. Some of his later acrylic paintings took years to finish, labored over but full of light.”

== Later years ==
After leaving Cornish, Stokes moved to New York City in the early 1990s, where he married Juilliard professor of dance and anatomy, Irene Dowd. He withdrew from the public dimension of the art world and spent the last two decades of his life in self-seclusion from that world, working on intricate and sometimes monumental paintings seen only by those close to him. As explained by critic Regina Hackett, “In 1996, in a catalog accompanying a retrospective at the Port Angeles Fine Arts Center, he told director Jake Seniuk that he felt he needed to increase his ‘physical and ideological isolation from the art community’ in order to make his own contribution to the culture. Seniuk said Stokes ‘fully embraced the role of the maverick’ and is ‘widely collected but rarely exhibited.’” After leaving Seattle’s Foster White Gallery in the late 1970s, Hackett wrote, Stokes “declined to seek representation in another. He was not online in any form and did not own a computer” but responded promptly to postal correspondence.

Critic Sheila Farr noted, “In later years, Mr. Stokes became more private about his work and the paintings became increasingly time-consuming and intricate,” according to his son, composer-musician Saul Stokes of Oakland, California. Although intensely serious about his work, Stokes is said to have retained his personability and sense of humor. According to Farr, his son Ian, a Web designer in Los Angeles, “remembers his father as a meticulous technician, whose sly sense of humor flavored everything he did.” "He never ran out of ideas," his wife, Irene Dowd, told Regina Hackett. “When he wasn't painting, she said, he'd draw or make notes for paintings. He also made jewelry, watches and tiny sculptures out of epoxy, all as a means of thinking with his hands. . . . He never did less than art required of him.”

Stokes died of cancer, at his home in New York, on April 19, 2008.

== Legacy ==
A large group of Stokes’ early works were recently donated via his estate to the Museum of Northwest Art in La Conner, Washington. According to the museum’s director, Greg Robinson, a full, cataloged retrospective exhibition of Charles Stokes’s work is planned.
