= Red letter edition =

Bible printing words attributed to Jesus in red ink

Red letter edition Bibles use red ink to emphasize the words of Jesus Christ.

== History ==
The inspiration for printing the words of Jesus in red comes from Luke 22:20: "This cup is the new testament in my blood, which I shed for you." On 19 June 1899, Louis Klopsch, then editor of The Christian Herald magazine, conceived the idea while working on an editorial. Klopsch asked his mentor Thomas De Witt Talmage what he thought of a New Testament with the words of Jesus in red and Talmage replied, "It could do no harm and it most certainly could do much good."

Klopsch published the first modern red letter edition New Testament later in 1899. The first modern, fully "red letter" Bible was published in 1901. The red letter bible instantly became popular, and is sometimes favored by Protestant Christians in the United States. The format has been cited as particularly useful in King James Version editions, which do not use quotation marks.

== Previous use of red in documents ==
Many ancient manuscripts would occasionally use red ink for various reasons.

== Interpretations ==
Because the original texts of the Bible do not have quotation marks, which words exactly are of Jesus has been interpreted, as opposed to explanatory text that follows them. For example, a footnote in the NRSVue for John 3:15 and 3:21 explains that "Some interpreters hold that the quotation concludes with verse 15."

== See also ==
- Red-Letter Christians
- Blue Letter Bible
- BRG Bible
