= J. Edward Simmons =

American lawyer and banker

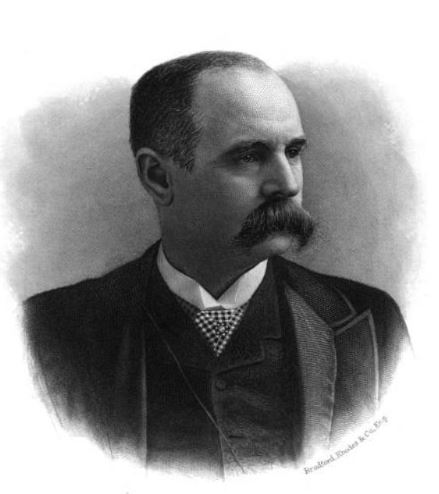

President of the New York Stock Exchange
- In office 1884–1886
- Preceded by: Alfrederick Smith Hatch
- Succeeded by: James D. Smith

Personal details
- Born: Joseph Edward Simmons; September 9, 1841 Troy, New York, U.S.
- Died: August 5, 1910 (aged 68)
- Spouse: Julia Greer (m. 1866)
- Children: 5
- Education: Williams College; Albany Law School
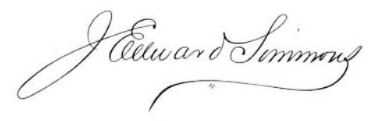
- Signature

Joseph Edward Simmons (September 9, 1841 – August 5, 1910) was an American lawyer and banker who served as president of the New York Stock Exchange, the New York Clearing House and of the New York Chamber of Commerce.

== Early life ==
Simmons was born at Troy in Rensselaer County, New York, on September 9, 1841. He was the eldest son of Mary Sophia (née Gleason) Simmons (1819–1872), a native of New Hampshire, and Joseph Ferris Simmons (1818–1879), a prosperous merchant. His siblings were Dr. Charles Ezra Simmons and Emma Kate Simmons (the wife of Charles Ranlett Flint, the founder of the Computing-Tabulating-Recording Company which later became IBM).

His paternal grandparents were Patience (née Safford) Simmons and Christian John Simmons, who was born at Rensselaerswyck. His maternal grandfather, Captain Samuel Gleason, was a veteran of the War of 1812 and his great-grandfather, also named Samuel Gleason, was a veteran of the Revolutionary War.

He was first educated at Troy Academy followed by boarding school in Sand Lake, New York. He graduated from Williams College in Williamstown, Massachusetts (where he later served as a trustee) in 1862 and from Albany Law School, the oldest law school in New York, in 1863.

== Career ==
Simmons practiced law in Troy until 1867, when he moved to New York City and became involved in the banking and brokerage business. In 1868, he became a partner of Benjamin L. DeForest (a brother of George Beach de Forest Jr.). In 1870, he was admitted to membership in the banking house of Grant & Co., a "conservative old Wall Street commission house," before retiring from the firm at the close of 1872 due to ill health. After a year spent recuperating in Florida, he returned to New York and resumed working on Wall Street.

In 1884, he was elected President of the New York Stock Exchange, assuming the presidency of the Exchange from Alfrederick Smith Hatch, whose firm Fisk & Hatch, had failed, along with other prominent firms such as the Marine Bank and Grant & Ward, a Ponzi scheme run by Ward which bankrupt the former President Grant. Simmons served as president of the Exchange for two terms until 1886 when he retired from the presidency and was succeeded by stockbroker James D. Smith. In his retirement speech, he stated:

"You must be awake. You must be progressive. You are behind the times. You must catch up or you cannot hope to hold your own. You must certify to the public that you have the public's interests at heart. You cannot go on forever devoted to the theory that your only province is to collect commissions. You must recognize that you are a representative public body; and in this recognition you must assume responsibilities and perform functions which hitherto the Stock Exchange has not. You can make this institution the greatest on earth, or by narrow policies you can shrivel its future up. To progress you must be progressive. You must broaden your policies; you must command outside public confidence. You must stand for more than the mere professionalism of buying and selling stocks; you must be more than traders; you are entitled to be a great National body; it is your own fault--and it will be to your own detriment--if you fall short of the opportunities which exist, of demands properly made upon you."

After he stepped down from the Exchange, Simmons and his three children traveled to Europe. In January 1888, Simmons became president of the Fourth National Bank, serving as president until his death in 1910. By 1897, when he became president of the New York Clearing House, the market value of the Bank had doubled in the markets.

In 1907, he became president of the New York Chamber of Commerce, as well as president of the Panama Railroad Company, serving as president of both until his death in August 1910. The president of Chase National Bank, A. Barton Hepburn, succeeded Simmons as president of the Chamber of Commerce.

=== Public service ===
In 1881, he was appointed a Commissioner of the New York City Board of Education by Mayor William Russell Grace. In 1884, he was reappointed by Mayor Franklin Edson and, in 1886, he was chosen president of the Board to succeed Stephen A. Walker who was appointed U.S. Attorney for the Southern District of New York by President Cleveland. Reportedly, due to Simmons' efforts, the national flag was placed in all school rooms to "inspire the pupils with sentiments of patriotism and loyalty." He served as president of the Board for four years. Simmons was one of the closest personal friends of Samuel J. Tilden, who served as the governor of New York from January 1875 to December 1876.

In 1893, he supported Representative Ashbel P. Fitch in his candidacy for Comptroller of New York City. In 1896, Simmons, a "sound-money Democrat" supported William McKinley, the Republican nominee for president. After McKinley won, Simmons was quoted in The New York Times stating:

"The triumphal success of McKinley and Hobart relieves the business community of a tension that has been most severe, and gives assurance to all of the maintenance of our Government on the basis of law and order and the payment of all its obligations in the best money of the world. This is a triumph, not of party, but of principle, and every good citizen should congratulate himself upon a victory which can only be most beneficial to all. I believe that the triumph of sound money, the repudiation of a financial heresy, and of Anarchistic doctrines will be of lasting benefit to the country, and will put the stamp of popular disapproval upon the disreputable attempt of the Bryan faction to stir up class and sectional feeling. The sound-money Democrats have proved themselves to be patriots in this great crisis in our country's history, and the result shows that they have disregarded all their party alliances and have given a loyal support to McKinley and Hobart."

In 1904, he was selected to be the treasurer of the Democratic National Committee, but declined the nomination. In 1905, he was the first president of the New York City Board of Water Supply (which launched the Catskill Aqueduct project and built the Hillview Reservoir in Yonkers). He also served as president of the Board until his death.

== Personal life ==
On April 12, 1866, Simmons was married to Julia Greer (1845–1917), a daughter of George Greer of New York. Together, they lived at 28 West 52nd Street in New York City, and were the parents of five children, including:

- Joseph Ferris Simmons (1868–1937), who married Mabel Louisa Storm, a daughter of Thomas and Sarah Matilda (née Boyd) Storm, in 1906.
- Julia Greer Simmons (1874–1891), who died aged 17 in New York City.

Simmons was a member of Metropolitan Club, the University Club, the St. Nicholas Society, and the Masons (of which he served as grand master of the Grand Lodge of New York in 1883). He also served as a trustee of the New York Hospital and was a manager of the New York Infant Asylum.

After a ten-day illness, following a year of impaired health, Simmons died on August 5, 1910, at Lake Mohonk. He was buried at Woodlawn Cemetery in the Bronx.

=== Legacy ===
In June 1885, Simmons was awarded an honorary LL.D. from the University of Vermont in "recognition of his distinguished services in the cause of education." After his death, many of the various organizations to which he was involved held memorials to his memory, including the Chamber of Commerce in October 1910.
