= BLB =

BLB may refer to:

- Bad Berleburg, Germany, vehicle registration
- Blacklight Blue, a fluorescent black light emitting negligible visible light
- Blue Letter Bible
- Former USAF Howard Air Force Base, Panama, IATA code
  - Public commercial airport terminal at Howard Air Force Base, Panamá Pacífico International Airport
- Bryant-Lake Bowl
