= Louis Klopsch =

German-American journalist and publisher (1852–1910)

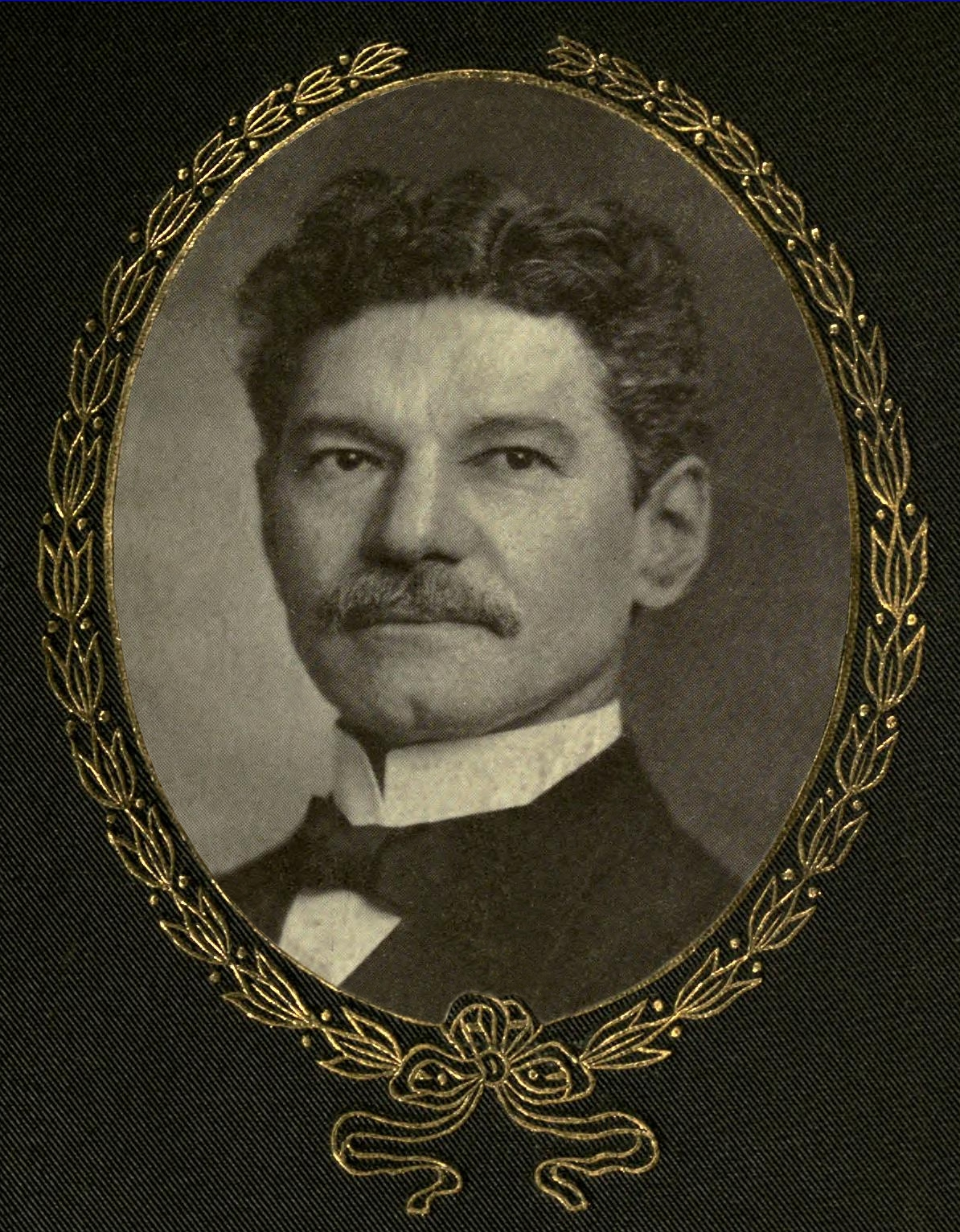
Louis Klopsch

Louis Klopsch (March 7, 1852 – March 6, 1910) was a German-American journalist, publisher, and fundraiser for charitable causes. He originated red letter editions of the Bible.

== Early life ==
Louis Klopsch was born in Lübben, Prussia, on March 7, 1852. His father, Dr. Osmar Klopsch, emigrated to the United States after the death of Klopsch's mother in 1853, settling in New York City. Klopsch was educated in public schools and graduated from a journalism school. He married May E. Merritt, daughter of Rev. Stephen Merritt, in 1886.

== Early career ==
His first publishing enterprise was a free paper called Good Morning. This was followed by a publication called the Daily Hotel Reporter, launched in 1876. He then purchased a printing office.

From 1884 to 1890 he ran the Pictorial Association Press, which distributed pictures to newspapers. From 1885 to 1903 he ran the Talmage Sermon Syndicate, distributing the sermons of prominent minister Thomas De Witt Talmage of the Brooklyn Tabernacle. He was named one of Talmage's literary executors on his death in 1902.

== Christian Herald and charitable work ==
In 1889 Klopsch arranged to travel to Europe and Palestine with Talmage, and while in England Klopsch arranged to take over the American edition of Rev. Michael Baxter's religious newspaper The Christian Herald. Klopsch soon put Talmage in charge as editor, and the circulation increased to over 200,000 by the time of Klopsch's death in 1910.

Klopsch conducted various charitable fundraising drives through the Herald, raising over $4,000,000 for relief efforts worldwide. Major campaigns were run for relief of Russian famine victims in 1892, the Indian famine of 1896–97, and again for India in 1900, when he traveled to India to distribute relief funds. His relief efforts for victims of the 1908 Messina earthquake were recognized by Victor Emmanuel III of Italy. Klopsch received international awards for his efforts, including a gold Kaisar-i-Hind Medal from Edward VII for his work in India and the Order of the Rising Sun from Emperor Meiji of Japan.

In 1895 Klopsch purchased the financially distressed Bowery Mission and its building and became its president. With excess money from a food fundraising drive for the mission Klopsch founded a summer camp, the Christian Herald Children's Home, in Nyack, New York, for poor children from New York City.

Klopsch authored Daily Light on the Daily Path (1906), a book of daily prayers. He edited and published A Budget of Christmas Tales by Charles Dickens and others (1895) and Many Thoughts of Many Minds (1896), a book of quotations.

== Red letter edition ==
In 1899 Klopsch read the words of Luke 22:20 ("This cup is the new testament in my blood, which I shed for you.") and conceived the idea of printing a new edition of the Bible with Jesus' words rubricated. He was encouraged by Talmage to put his idea into practice. Published by Klopsch in 1901, the new Bible was a success, and the idea of printing Jesus' words in red became widely adopted.

== Death ==
Klopsch died at German Hospital in Manhattan on March 6, 1910. A memorial service was held for him on April 14, 1910, at the New Masonic Hall on 24th Street. Speakers included Episcopal bishop James Henry Darlington, Judge Arthur S. Tompkins, and Rev. John Wesley Hill. Klopsch was buried in Sleepy Hollow Cemetery in Tarrytown, New York. Writer Amelia Edith Huddleston Barr, a friend, was buried nearby at her request after her death in 1918.
