= Alfrederick Smith Hatch =

American investment banker (1829–1904)

Alfrederick Hatch

President of the New York Stock Exchange
- In office 1883–1884
- Preceded by: Frederick N. Lawrence
- Succeeded by: J. Edward Simmons

Personal details
- Born: Alfrederick Smith Hatch; July 24, 1829 Vermont
- Died: May 13, 1904 (aged 74)
- Resting place: Sleepy Hollow, Westchester County, New York
- Parent(s): Horace Hatch; Mary Yates Smith
- Occupation: Investment banker

Alfrederick Smith Hatch (July 24, 1829 – May 13, 1904) was an American investment banker who founded Fisk & Hatch along with Harvey Fisk. Hatch was the President of the New York Stock Exchange from 1883 to 1884.

== Life ==
Hatch was born in Vermont to Horace Hatch (1788–1873) and Mary Yates Smith (1798–1859).

In March 1862, Hatch and Harvey Fisk began a finance and insurance company called, Fisk & Hatch. The company initially focused almost exclusively in government bonds. Both men were short on capital at the time and relied on $15,000 worth of loans from family and friends. Hatch and Fisk found success as sub-agents for Jay Cooke & Company, popularizing and selling millions of dollars in government war securities in New York and New England. The two quickly became the front rank of bond dealers.

In 1871, Hatch commissioned a portrait of his family at his house on Park Avenue and 37th Street. In 1872, he donated a building he owned on 316 Water Street to Jerry McAuley and his wife, Maria. McAuley used the building to established a rescue mission for homeless men called the "Helping Hand for Men". This establishment would later become the New York City Rescue Mission.

Hatch was the President of the New York Stock Exchange from 1883 to 1884.

== Death ==
Hatch died on May 13, 1904, at the age of 74.
