= The Bowery Mission =

Christian rescue mission in New York City, U.S.

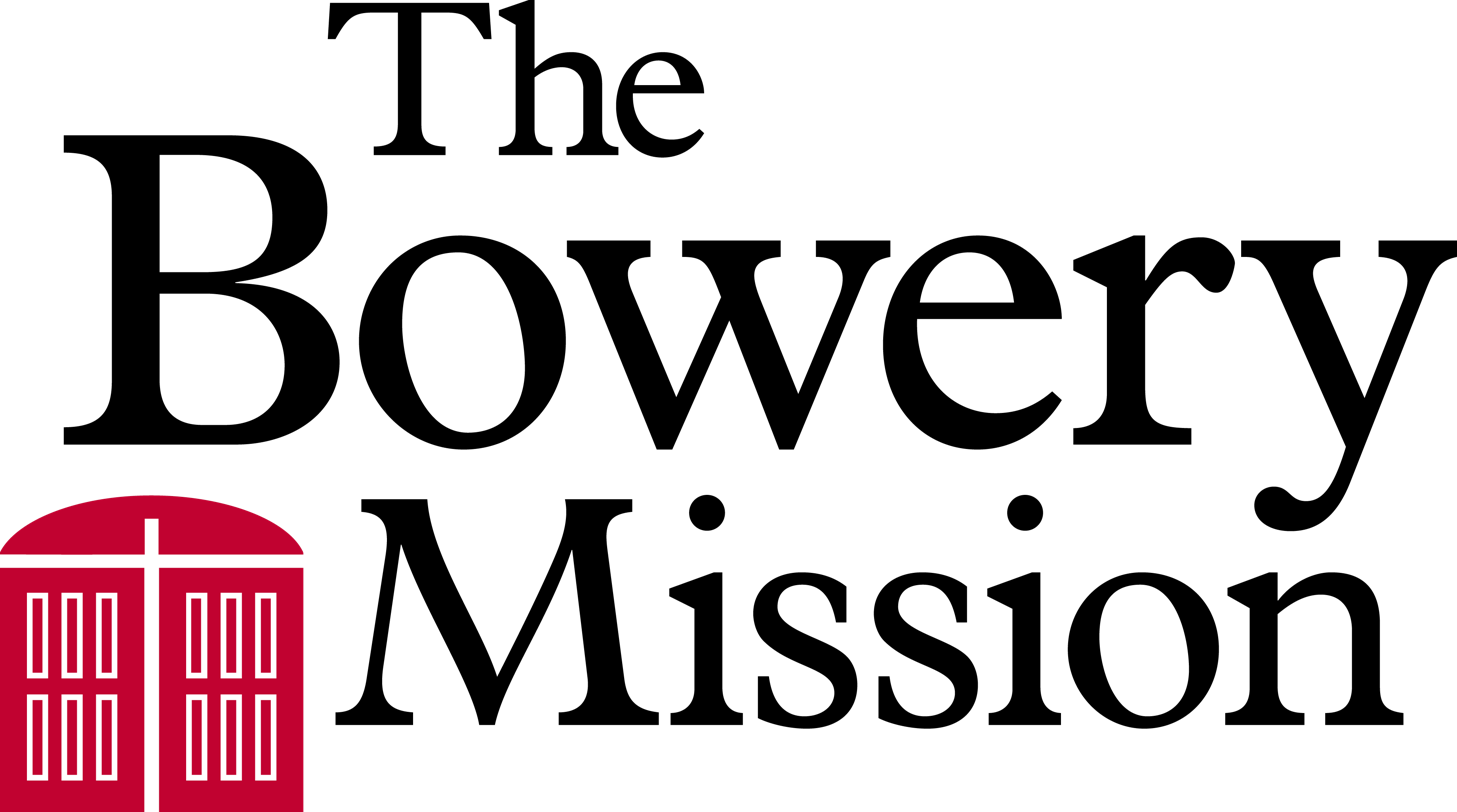

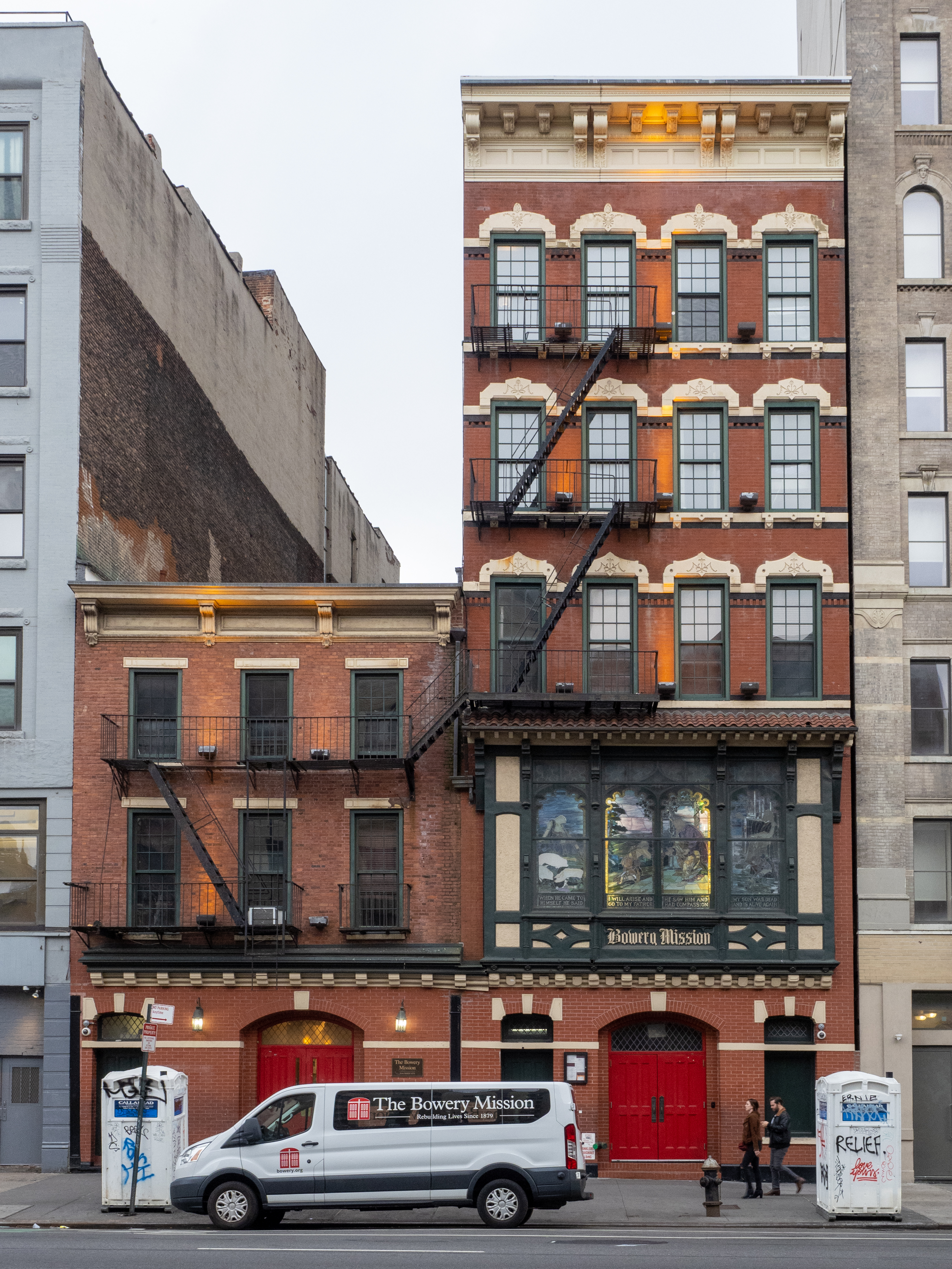
- Flagship location at 227-229 Bowery
- Established: 1879
- Type: private nonprofit
- Tax ID no.: 13-1617086
- Region served: New York metropolitan area
- Services: basic needs and emergency care, homeless services, residential programs
- Key people: James Winans, President & CEO
- Parent organization: Christian Herald Association
- Website: www.bowery.org
- Bowery Mission
- U.S. Historic district – Contributing property
- New York City Landmark
- Location within Manhattan Location within New York City Location within New York Location within the United States
- Location: 227 Bowery, Manhattan, New York, US
- Coordinates: 40°43′20″N 73°59′35″W
- Built: 1876
- Architect: William Jose
- Architectural style: neo-Grec, Tudor Mission
- Part of: The Bowery Historic District (ID13000027)
- NYCL No.: 2494

Significant dates
- Designated CP: February 20, 2013
- Designated NYCL: June 26, 2012

The Bowery Mission is a 501(c)(3) nonprofit that provides hot meals, overnight shelter, and faith-based residential programs for homeless New Yorkers. Its mission statement reads: "The Bowery Mission meets essential needs and creates transformative community... so that together we overcome homelessness and poverty, and flourish through the power and love of Jesus Christ."

It is one of the oldest nonprofits in New York City, and continues to provide hot meals and chapel services three times daily at its historic 227 Bowery campus between Rivington Street and Stanton Street in the Bowery neighborhood of Manhattan, New York City.

Since the 1990s, The Bowery Mission has expanded from a soup kitchen and men's shelter to providing programs and services at six campuses across the NYC metro area. It is a member of the Citygate Network and is accredited by the ECFA.

== Programs ==
=== Programs for Adults ===
At its downtown campuses at 227 Bowery and 90 Lafayette St., The Bowery Mission provides hot meals, clothing, safe overnight shelter and other basic needs and emergency services for New Yorkers experiencing hunger and homelessness. At its uptown campuses, The Bowery Mission provides faith-based Residential Programs for adults in crisis to achieve personal goals for life and work, heal from past trauma, and overcome barriers to independent living.

=== Programs for Children ===
The Bowery Mission's programs for children, Mont Lawn Summer Camp and City Camp, provide children from low-income neighborhoods with opportunities for leadership, skill building, and personal growth. Located in East Harlem and the South Bronx, Mont Lawn City Camp offers year-round enrichment classes, tutoring, and mentoring for children and youth.

== History ==
The Bowery Mission was founded in 1879 by the Reverend Albert Gleason Ruliffson and Ellen Dorchester Ruliffson. It was the third rescue mission established in the United States and the second in New York City after Water Street Mission established by Jerry McAuley and Maria McAuley in 1872. It had long been the wish of the Jerry McAuley to open a similar mission on the East Side. He frequently talked over the subject with the Ruliffsons, and they opened the mission in a small room at 14 Bowery.

Co-founder with her husband, Rev. Albert Ruliffson, of the Bowery Mission, NYC.

Before finding its permanent home at 227 Bowery, the Mission operated in a number of locations in the Bowery neighborhood. It moved to 36 Bowery in 1880 followed by 105 Bowery in 1887. When 105 Bowery was destroyed by fire in 1898, the Mission moved to 55 Bowery and remained there until the building was scheduled to be demolished to make way for the approaches to the Manhattan Bridge.

In the 1880s, Fanny Crosby became a favorite guest at the Mission and was frequently asked to give an address. For 16 years, Crosby wrote a new hymn to be sung at The Bowery Mission anniversary celebration held in November.

In 1895 the Mission was bought by Dr. Louis Klopsch, owner of the Christian Herald, to save it from economic distress. It became one of many domestic charities sponsored by the publication. Klopsch became president and the Mission was formally incorporated as Bowery Mission and Young Men's Home in 1897. One prominent board member was Sarah J. Bird, a philanthropist who was known as "the Mother of the Bowery Mission" due to her long-time service to the organization from 1881 to 1914.

In 1900, The Bowery Mission came under the supervision of John Greener Hallimond, originally from England. Hallimond introduced many innovative services, such as a home for women in Brooklyn, a Free Labor Bureau, and the famed breadline, which began in 1902. The Free Labor Bureau, which connected laborers with farm work outside the city, was opened in 1908 in response to rampant unemployment. Transportation was provided to locations as far as 50 miles away.

In 1956, The Bowery Mission was featured prominently in Lionel Rogison's award-winning docufiction film On The Bowery, which forever immortalizes life in New York City's skid row. In the film, George Bolton, then superintendent of The Bowery Mission, preaches to a crowd of men in the mission's historic chapel.

== 227 Bowery Location ==
The Bowery Mission moved to its current location at 227 Bowery in 1909. On June 26, 2012, 227 Bowery was designated a New York City landmark.

227 Bowery was originally built in 1876 for Jonas Stolts, an undertaker and manufacturer of coffins. It was designed by William Jose in the neo-Grec style.

The building was altered in 1908–09 for the Mission's use by Marshall L. and Henry G. Emery. The Emerys remodeled the facade in a Tudor Revival style reminiscent of an English Inn and installed stained glass windows by Benjamin Sellers depicting the Parable of the Prodigal Son the second floor. The interior was remodeled into a chapel in the Gothic Revival style.

In 1928, the Christian Herald purchased the property from the Stolts family, from whom they had leased the property since 1909.

In the 1970s, the Mission's front doors were painted their iconic red by Frank Grande, a former alcoholic and "Bowery Bum." One night, after being stabbed in a park, Grande came to the Mission's doors bleeding. Grande chose the color red in homage to that encounter and to "symbolize Christ's blood as the entrance to life."

In 1980, the Mission acquired the Federal-style townhouse next door, 229 Bowery, and merged it with 227. The mission continues to provide meals and chapel services three times daily at this location. Chapel attendance is not required to receive a meal.

== Today ==
Beginning in the 2000s, new efforts were made toward expansion and the Mission opened residences for adults on the Upper East Side (2005), Harlem (2012) and East Harlem (2013).

In November 2017, New York City Rescue Mission became a controlled affiliate of The Bowery Mission. Under The Bowery Mission's leadership, its former campus at 90 Lafayette St. campus continues to provide emergency shelter and services with beds available on a walk-in basis.

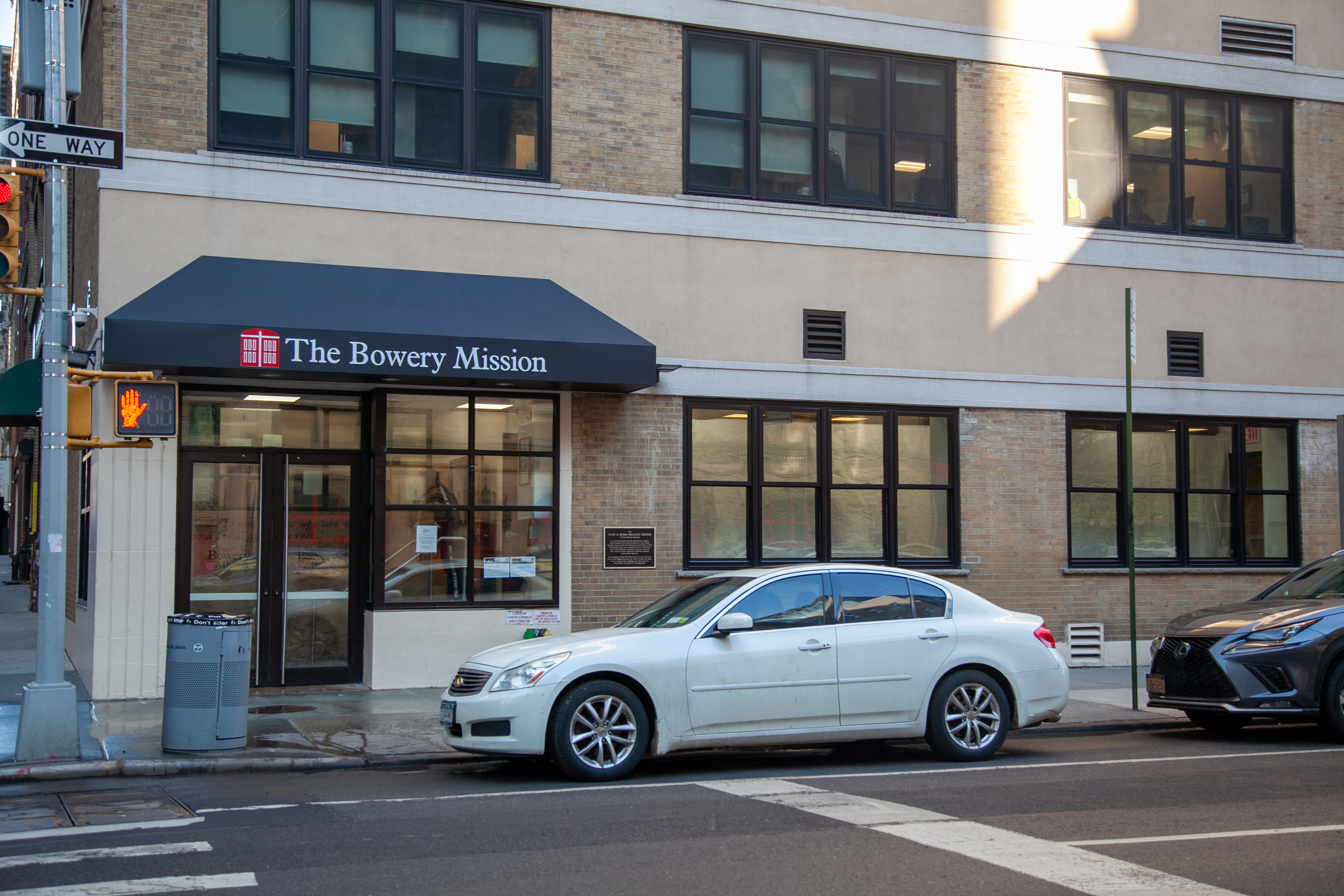
The Bowery Mission's location at 90 Lafayette Street, formerly New York City Rescue Mission

In 2020, The Bowery Mission provided more than 429,500 meals, 104,000 nights of shelter, 67,500 emergency showers, and 27,600 articles of clothing. In 2019, The Bowery Mission and its controlled affiliates received more than $7.3 million worth of donated food, clothing, and other items.

In the midst of the COVID-19 pandemic, The Bowery Mission continued to provide shelter and housing for nearly 325 people every night.

== Accountability ==
- The Bowery Mission is listed as a 4-star charity on Charity Navigator.
- The Bowery Mission is an accredited charity of the Better Business Bureau.
- The Bowery Mission is listed as a member of the Evangelical Council for Financial Accountability (ECFA).
- The Bowery Mission is listed as a Platinum member of Guidestar.
- The Bowery Mission is an accredited member of the Citygate Network.

== Connection to Mont Lawn Camp ==
The Bowery Mission was one of many domestic charities formerly sponsored by the Christian Herald under the leadership of Louis Klopsch.

In 1894, with money left over from a food drive, Klopsch established a children's home at Mont Lawn in Upper Nyack, New York, to serve children from immigrant families living on the Lower East Side. It remained at Nyack-on-the-Hudson for 69 years before it moved to the Pocono Mountains in Pennsylvania in 1961.

After the Herald ceased publication in 1992, Mont Lawn Camp continued under the ownership and operation of The Bowery Mission.

== See also ==
- Homelessness in New York
- Bowery
- New York City housing shortage
- National Register of Historic Places listings in New York County, New York
- List of New York City Designated Landmarks in Manhattan
