= BRG Bible =

Bible version with color-coded quotations

The Blue, Red and Gold Letter Edition of the Holy Bible, or BRG Bible, is a version of the King James translation of the Bible that describes itself as "an advancement of the 'Red Letter' Bible popular among many for over 110 years".

The BRG Bible is inspired by red letter Bibles, first published by German-born entrepreneur and philanthropist Louis Klopsch in 1901, which highlight the words of Jesus in red, owing to the color of blood. The BRG Bible uses blue ink for the spoken, quotable words of God the Father, red for the spoken words of Jesus and gold for references to the Holy Spirit. Additionally, words of angels (and other divine beings) are underlined in blue in the Old and New testaments, and messianic prophecies and indicators of Jesus Christ are underlined in red in the Old Testament.

An example of this coloring can be found in 1 John 5:7, in which "Father" appears in blue and "Holy Ghost" appears in gold.

The BRG Bible was created by Scott Johnson, the preacher for the East Faulkner Church of Christ in El Dorado, Arkansas, and published by BRG Bible Ministries.
