= Fisk & Robinson =

Defunct American financial firm specializing in bonds

- Type: Banking
- Industry: Financial services
- Predecessor: Harvey Fisk & Sons
- Founded: March 23, 1899
- Founder: Harvey Edward Fisk, George H. Robinson
- Defunct: 1915
- Fate: Fisk left the firm which continued with Robinson
- Successor: Robinson & Co.
- Headquarters: 35 Cedar Street, New York City, New York, United States
- Key people: Harvey Edward Fisk, George H. Robinson, Francis Jay Underhill
- Products: Finance and insurance
- Services: Investment

Fisk & Robinson was one of the best-known bond houses in Wall Street in the early 20th century, dealing in United States Treasury security and bonds, New York City and other municipal bonds. It was prominently connected with the financing of railroads.

== History ==
The firm was formed on March 23, 1899, by Harvey Edward Fisk, the son of Harvey Fisk, who was founder of the banking house of Harvey Fisk & Sons. Harvey E. Fisk was a partner in the firm of Harvey Fisk & Sons before he withdrew in 1899 and formed Fisk & Robinson. George H. Robinson was a Stock Exchange member and brought up with Harvey Fisk & Sons. Offices for the firm were at 35 Cedar Street, on the ground floor of the building at the northeast corner of Cedar and William Streets. The firm maintained branch offices in Chicago, Boston, and Worcester.

When offices were expanded to the second floor of the building on Cedar Street, it was commented how: "This house has made excellent strides within the past few years, and is justly recognized as one of the foremost and most successful firm of private bankers in the city."

The firm produced reports, such as the Memoranda concerning United States bonds: prepared for the information of national banks and others (1901), to assist those considering the purchase of United States bonds. A booklet was issued by Fisk & Robinson entitled Concerning Ironmaking. The report provided an overview of the foundations and history of iron and steel making in the U.S. Then the bulletin discussed special features of the Buffalo and Susquehanna Iron Company's plant, positioning Buffalo as an important blast furnace center.

In 1905 Fisk & Robinson announced the construction work was begun on a steel viaduct to connect Kansas City, Missouri, with Kansas City, Kansas. The viaduct was one and six-tenths mile long, and crossed the valley of the Kansas River above the network of railroad tracks from several railroads which occupy the river bottom.

Fisk & Robinson purchased nearly all of the Panama Canal 2% bonds sold by the Secretary of the Treasury Leslie M. Shaw in July 1906. The bankers were awarded about $17 million out of the total issue of $30 million and later acquired about $10 million more of the bonds from other successful bidders, including Samuel Byerley, then a clerk of the American Express Company, who was allotted $5,800,000 of the bonds.

Undertakings which the firm financed in whole or in part included the Gulf & Ship Island Railroad, the Louisiana & Arkansas Railway, the Kansas City Viaduct and Terminal Company, and the Keystone Telephone Company.

Among the railroad enterprises that Fisk & Robinson had undertaken was to finance the Buffalo and Susquehanna Railroad. Large amounts of securities of this railroad were taken by the firm, and in turn pledged for loans from a number of banks in New York City and other places. These securities depreciated in value, with the railroad proving less profitable than had been anticipated. When banks that lent to Fisk & Robinson sought additional security, Fisk & Robinson concluded that for the protection of its creditors, it was best to be placed in bankruptcy.

Between 1907 and 1908, Fisk & Robinson came to the aid of Oscar Keen, Merle Middleton, and George Frederick Keen in an effort to buy and sell the Baldwin Locomotive Works, a large manufacturing plant in Philadelphia, Pennsylvania.

At the close of banking hours on February 1, 1910, a petition in bankruptcy was filed against the firm in the United States District Court. Bronson Winthrop was appointed receiver by Judge Hand, and immediately took charge of the firm's affairs. A statement issued by Philban, Beekman, Menken & Griscom, counsel to the receiver, placed the liabilities of the firm at a little less than $7,000,000, with estimated assets slightly in excess of that sum. The assets included several large blocks of securities not readily salable. These were ultimately the cause of the failure. Petitioners in the bankruptcy filing were Henry Clark of 318 West 57th Street, John H. Thompson of 400 West 118th Street, and Joseph Stanley-Brown, office manager of the firm.

One of the factors that precipitated the bankruptcy of Fisk & Robinson was the death of F.H. Goodyear, who left an estate of about $10,000,000, and who was the chief financial backer of the Buffalo & Susquehanna.

George H. Robinson was reinstated to the New York Stock Exchange, and the firm resumed business on December 8, 1910.

By 1915, Harvey E. Fisk returned to working with the firm of Harvey Fisk & Sons. The firm formerly known as Fisk & Robinson continued as Robinson & Co.
