= Harvey Edward Fisk =

American banker and financial writer

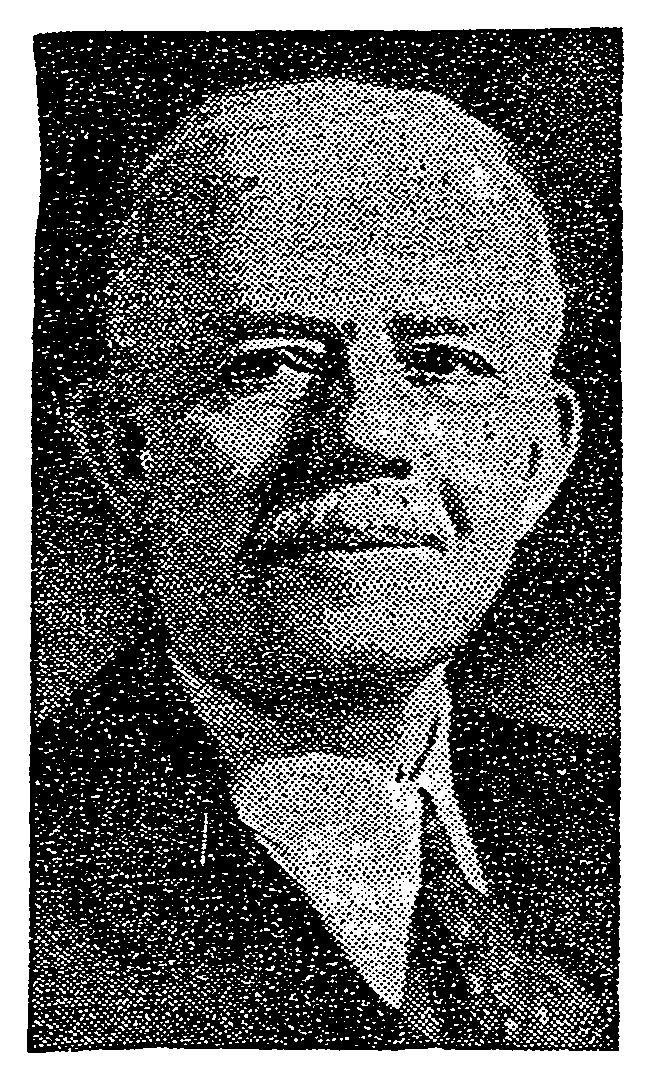
- Born: March 26, 1856; Jersey City, New Jersey, U.S.
- Died: October 8, 1944 (aged 88); Trenton, New Jersey, U.S.
- Occupation: Bond broker
- Employer: Fisk & Robinson
- Parent: Harvey Fisk (father)

Harvey Edward Fisk (March 26, 1856 – October 8, 1944) was an American banker and financial writer. At the time of his death he was the only surviving son of Harvey Fisk, who founded the banking house of Fisk & Hatch in 1862 and helped the Union finance the Civil War. He was associated with his brother Pliny Fisk, who was an outstanding investment banker before the first World War, in the management of their father's firm.

== Biography ==
Fisk was born in Jersey City in 1856. His mother was the former Louisa Green of Trenton. He graduated from Princeton University in 1877 and immediately joined the firm of Fisk & Hatch. In 1885 the firm was reorganized and became Harvey Fisk & Sons. Mr. Fisk specialized in railroad securities.

He resigned from the family company in 1898 and a year later formed a partnership with George H. Robinson for investment banking purposes. Harvey E. Fisk retired from the firm of Fisk & Robinson, on January 13, 1915. This caused the partnership to expire by limitation. The business continued at the same location, 26 Exchange Place, under the name of Robinson & Co. with members being George H. Robinson, Thomas G. Cook, and J. Stanley Brown. Fisk announced that he would be located hereafter at the office of Harvey Fisk & Sons. Three years later Mr. Fisk joined the Bankers Trust Company as a research writer.

Fisk specialized in the preparation of pamphlets and books on public finance, and, in one book, calculated that the total direct expenditure for World War I amounted to $223,000,000,000. He remained with the Bankers Trust until his retirement in 1930.

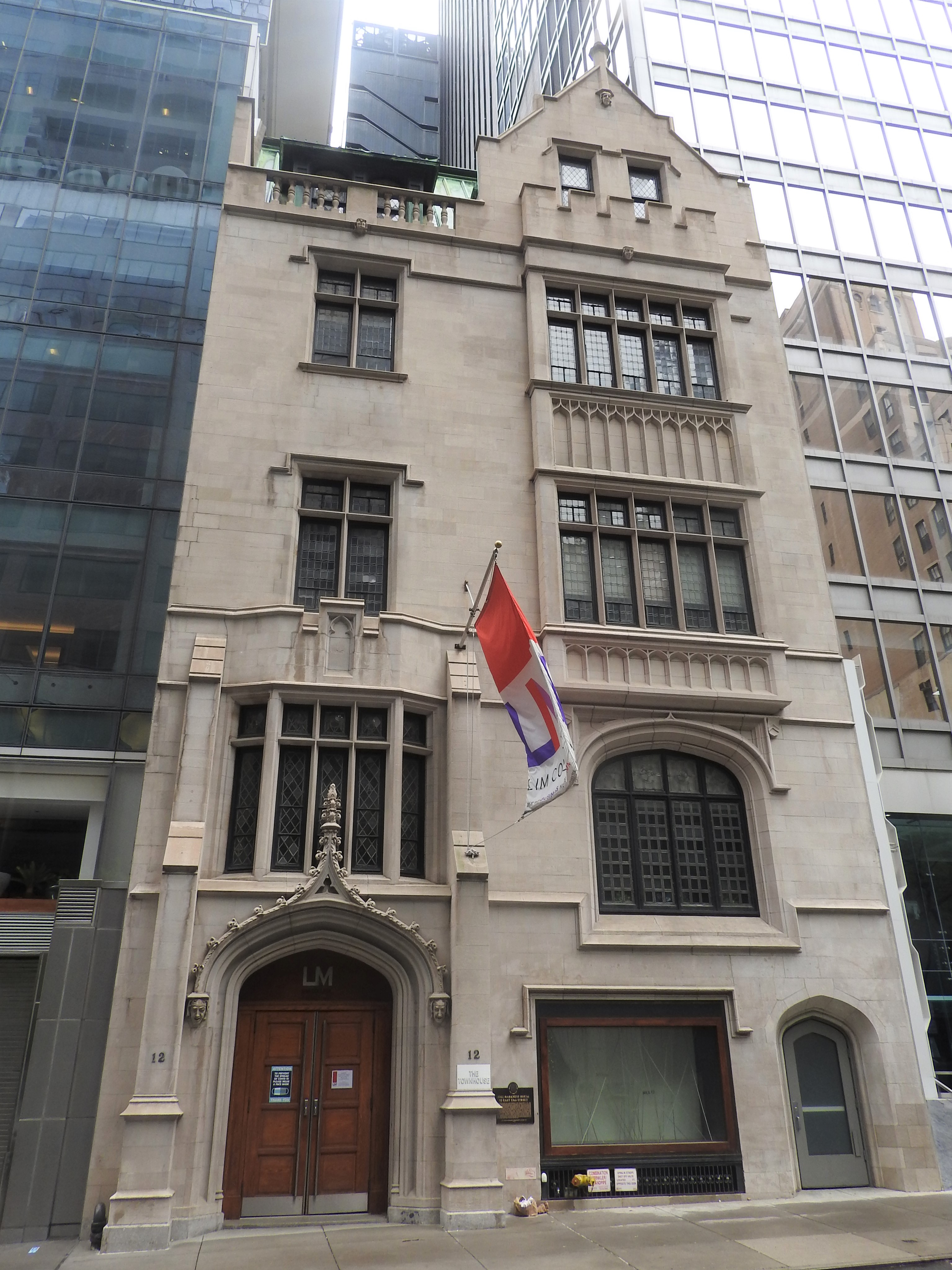
Harvey E. Fisk residence at 12 East 53rd Street in New York City.

In 1909, Harvey E. Fisk is reported to have sold his house at 12 East 53rd Street in Manhattan. The house was built for Mr. Fisk by Charles T. Wills from plans by Raleigh C. Gildersleeve. Previously there was an old brownstone on the lot which was owned by Walter G. Oakman. This was torn down except for the side walls, and a new dwelling put into its place. The unusual depth of the lot of 119.5 feet, allowed Fisk to carry out a plan of having three extra deep rooms. The main floor had a large reception room in front, a large music room in the middle, and an imposing dining room at the rear. This house which is still extant is a five-story American basement house, with a frontage of 37.6 feet. The house was sold to William L. Harkness, Standard Oil heir, for $400,000. All of the furnishing were including the rugs and tapestries that had been bought abroad, were included in the purchase. Harkness was a cousin of noted philanthropist Edward Harkness.

Harvey Edward Fisk was engaged in extensive philanthropic work. In his younger days he sponsored a boys' club on the West Side in New York. He also helped raise funds for Mercer Hospital in Trenton, New Jersey, where he died. Up to his death he was actively involved in the work of the Princeton University Library and was an honorary curator there of the Benjamin Strong collection of books on industry and finance.

== Family ==
Harvey Edward Fisk married Mary Lee Scudder in 1879. Mrs. Fisk for many years engaged in social service work with the Riverside Association. During World War I she devoted her time to aiding the United States Navy, and later provided clothing for wounded men returning from France. She was former chairman of the executive committee of the Sorosis Club, a life member of the New Jersey Society of the Colonial Dames of America and a member of the Daughters of the American Revolution. At the time of her death, Mrs. Fisk was living in her apartment at the Madison Square Hotel, 37 Madison Avenue.

In addition to his brother Pliny, Harvey E. Fisk's other brothers were Charles J. Fisk, banker and former Mayor of Plainfield, New Jersey; Wilbur C. Fisk, former president of the Hudson & Manhattan Railroad Company; and Alexander G. Fisk, also a banker. Harvey Edward Fisk married Mary Lee Scudder of Trenton, New Jersey, in 1879. They remained married until her death in 1941. Fisk had two sons: Harvey E. Fisk Jr., of Fairfield, Connecticut, and Kenneth Fisk of Roseland, New Jersey, and three sisters, Miss Mary Louis Fisk, Mrs. Samuel Wood Thurber of Princeton, and Mrs. John Warren DuBois Gould of 102 East Twenty-second Street, New York City. Harvey Edward Fisk died at the age of 88 on October 8, 1944.

== Works ==
- The Inter-Ally Debts: An Analysis of War and Post-War Public Finance 1914-1923 (1924)
