= Albert Gleason Ruliffson =

American missionary (1833–1896)

Albert Gleason Ruliffson (April 1, 1833 – May 2, 1896) was a minister and the founder in 1879 of the Bowery Mission in Manhattan's Bowery neighborhood. He served as President of its Board of Trustees and was active in its work until September, 1895.

He was born on April 1, 1833 in Gilboa, New York to Ruliff Ruliffson and Candace Gleason. He died in Perth Amboy, New Jersey.
