= Frederick N. Lawrence =

President of the New York Stock Exchange
- In office 1882–1883
- Preceded by: Donald Mackay
- Succeeded by: Alfrederick Smith Hatch

Personal details
- Born: Frederick Newbold Lawrence; February 28, 1834 Bayside, New York, U.S.
- Died: December 24, 1916 (aged 82) Manhattan, New York, U.S.
- Party: Democrat
- Spouse: Elizabeth Boyce (m. 1855; died 1894)
- Relations: Effingham Lawrence (uncle); Cornelius Lawrence (stepfather)
- Children: 4
- Parent(s): Edward Newbold Lawrence; Lydia Ann Lawrence

Frederick Newbold Lawrence (February 28, 1834 – December 24, 1916) was an American financier who served as president of the Union Club of the City of New York and president of the New York Stock Exchange.

== Early life ==
Lawrence was born on February 28, 1834, in Bayside, Queens. He was a son of Edward Newbold Lawrence (1805–1839) and Lydia Ann (née Lawrence) Lawrence (1811–1879). After his father's death, his mother married her cousin Cornelius Van Wyck Lawrence, who served successively as a U.S. Representative, mayor of New York City, and Collector of the Port of New York. From his mother's second marriage, he had several half-siblings, including Van Wyck Lawrence and James Ogden Lawrence.

He was a descendant of mayor of New York City John Lawrence and John Bowne, both Quakers and pioneer English settlers of Queens. His paternal grandparents were Hannah (née Newbold) Lawrence and merchant John Burling Lawrence, and his maternal grandparents were Anna (née Townsend) Lawrence and Effingham Lawrence. His uncle Effingham Lawrence is known for serving for the shortest term in congressional history, serving for just one day in the U.S. House of Representatives.

== Career ==
After a few years of schooling, he entered the brokerage business at an early age. He was the senior partner in the stock exchange firm of Lawrence & Smith, which dissolved about twenty-five years before his death.

Lawrence was the President of the New York Stock Exchange from 1882 to 1883. Lawrence was also prominent in Democratic politics and served as Supervisor of the town of Flushing.

During the U.S. Civil War, he commanded the 15th Regiment of the New York National Guard. After being elected a member of the Union Club in October 1881, he served as president from February 13, 1907, until February 14, 1912.

== Personal life ==
In 1855, Lawrence was married to Elizabeth Boyce (1835–1894). Elizabeth was a daughter of Lee Boyce, a merchant from Charleston, South Carolina. In 1847, Lawrence built a mansion in Queens called the Oaks which fronted Oakland Pond in modern-day Alley Pond Park. Today, the neighborhood is known as Oakland Gardens which derives its name from estate. Together, they were the parents of "the four Lawrence sisters, famous for their beauty, who have always been great favorites in society." They were:

- Lillie Lawrence (1857–1920), who married Brig. Gen. Charles Hedges McKinstry, an engineer and army officer.
- Mary "Tibbie" Lawrence (1859–1942), who married stockbroker Frank Worth White (1856–1887) in 1878. After his death, she married Foxhall Parker Keene in 1892. Keene was the son of James Robert Keene, a former president of the San Francisco Stock Exchange. They divorced in 1909.
- Elizabeth Lawrence (1862–1906), who married J. Henry Alexandre (1848–1912), a son of Francis Alexandre, in 1887. Alexandre was prominent in steamship circles (the Alexandre Line was bought out by rival Ward Line in 1888).
- Virginia Lee Lawrence (1864–1891), who married Lewis Meredith Howland, a son of Edgar Howland of Howland & Aspinwall, in 1883. Samuel M. Roosevelt, Howland's business partner, was his best man. After her death, Lewis married Leonora von Stosch (they later divorced and Leonora married Sir Edgar Speyer).

His wife died at their residence in Bayside on June 26, 1894. Lawrence died in his townhouse at 57 West 52nd Street, which he had built shortly before his death, on December 24, 1916. He was buried at Lawrence Burying Ground in Bayside.

=== Descendants ===
Through his daughter Virginia, he was a grandfather of Elizabeth "Elsie" Lawrence Howland (1885–1973), who married Justice Frederic Kernochan (son of J. Frederic Kernochan and Mary Stuart Whitney Kernochan), in 1910.

Business positions
Preceded by Donald Mackay	President of the New York Stock Exchange; 1882 – 1883	Succeeded by Alfrederick Smith Hatch
