= Harvey Fisk & Sons =

- Type: Banking
- Industry: Finance and insurance
- Founded: March 26, 1885
- Founder: Harvey Fisk; Harvey Edward Fisk
- Headquarters: 40 Wall Street; New York City, New York, U.S.
- Services: Investment

Harvey Fisk & Sons was formed in 1885 from the firm Fisk & Hatch that dated back to 1862. The firm was prominent in railroad financing and financed the American Locomotive Company and the Hudson & Manhattan Railroad.

== History ==
In March 1885 the partnership of Fisk & Hatch was dissolved, and the firm reorganized under the name of Harvey Fisk & Sons on March 26, 1885, by Harvey Fisk in connection with his three oldest sons Harvey Edward Fisk, Charles J. Fisk, and Pliny Fisk. Alexander G. Fisk and Wilbur C. Fisk were subsequently admitted to the firm.

Among early projects were financing of the American Locomotive Company, the tunnels beneath the Hudson River, and financing the Spanish–American War.

During Grover Cleveland's first administration, Harvey Fisk & Sons sold the government over $50,000,000 in bonds. During the first two years of Benjamin Harrison's administration they sold the government an equal amount. The last sale, marking the climax of the government's purchases was for $7,000,000 of 4 percent bonds, on September 17, 1890.

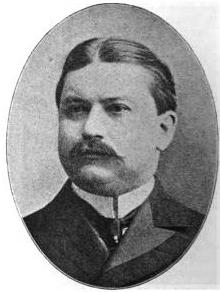
Pliny Fisk, son of Harvey Fisk

During the last few years of the life of the senior Harvey Fisk prior to his death in December 1890, the responsibility devolved to his sons. Pliny Fisk, who inherited much of his father's ability in finance, took a leading place in the firm.

Harvey Edward Fisk was a partner in the firm of Harvey Fisk & Sons before he withdrew in 1899 and formed Fisk & Robinson. George H. Robinson was a Stock Exchange member and brought up with Harvey Fisk & Sons.

For forty years prior to 1919, the firm had membership in the New York Stock Exchange, but in that year membership was dropped and it was decided to deal exclusively in investment bonds.

Following the stock market crash in 1929, Harvey Fisk & Sons was the first investment house to discontinue all margin accounts and confine themselves to cash business. This was done so that the firm may devote its "entire business and attention to investment and cash commission business."

A new partnership was formed in 1930 with the name of Harvey Fisk & Sons, to succeed a firm with the same name. General partners in the new firm were Frederic M. Halsey, Frank L. Scherrer. Special partners were John Aspinwall and Charles S. Eytinge. The Stock Exchange membership of the late John C. Collingwood, who was the senior partner of the former firm of Harvey Fisk & Sons, was transferred to Mr. Scherrer.

Robert A. Morse became associated with Harvey Fisk & Sons, Inc., in 1940. At that time Harvey Fisk & Sons were investment bankers specializing in United States Government, State and municipal bonds. Mr. Morse originally was with Lehman Brothers in their municipal bond departments and recently had been with Otis & Co., Inc., in the same capacity.
