= New York City Rescue Mission =

Mission and shelter in New York City

- Predecessor: McAuley Water Street Mission
- Merged into: The Bowery Mission
- Formation: 1872; 154 years ago
- Founder: Jerry McAuley; Maria McAuley
- Founded at: New York City
- Headquarters: Manhattan, New York City, 10013
- Location: 90 Lafayette St
- Services: Rescue mission Soup kitchen Homeless shelter Food bank
- Website: nycrescue.org
- Formerly called: Helping Hand for Men; McAuley Water Street Mission

New York City Rescue Mission, now a controlled affiliate of The Bowery Mission, was founded in 1872 by Jerry McAuley and his wife, Maria with the purpose of providing a soup kitchen and homeless shelter.

== History ==
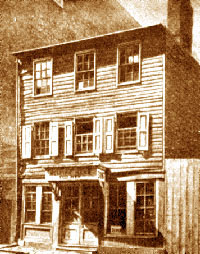
Original 316 Water Street Mission, 1892

Homelessness was on the rise in New York City during the 1870s largely due to a wave of European immigration. In 1872, investment banker Alfrederick Smith Hatch donated a former dancing hall located on 316 Water Street to Jerry McAuley and his wife, Maria Fahy McAuley. The couple opened a rescue mission called The Helping Hand for Men. The name soon changed to McAuley's Water Street Mission.

After three years, McAuley and his friends built a three-story brick building to replace the original frame structure. In 1912, that building was torn down and a new four-story building was erected. It was designed by architect Bradford Gilbert, former mission trustee and second husband to Maria after McAuley's death. The building cost $100,000 and included a chapel, dormitories, and modern conveniences.

In 1927, the John Markle dormitory was dedicated. During the 1960s, McAuley Water Street Mission moved to its current location at 90 Lafayette Street. In 2000, the rescue mission was renamed to its current name, New York City Rescue Mission. The building began expansion for a third floor in 2011.

Since its founding, the homeless shelter provided housing for men only. In 2014, the shelter opened to women after 142 years of being male-exclusive. By 2015, 220 beds were available.

== Today ==
In November 2017, New York City Rescue Mission became a controlled affiliate of The Bowery Mission. The organization’s 90 Lafayette St. campus is now called The Bowery Mission’s Tribeca Campus and serves as the combined organization’s primary site for overnight shelter and care.
