= Benjamin Sellers =

British-American stained glass artist

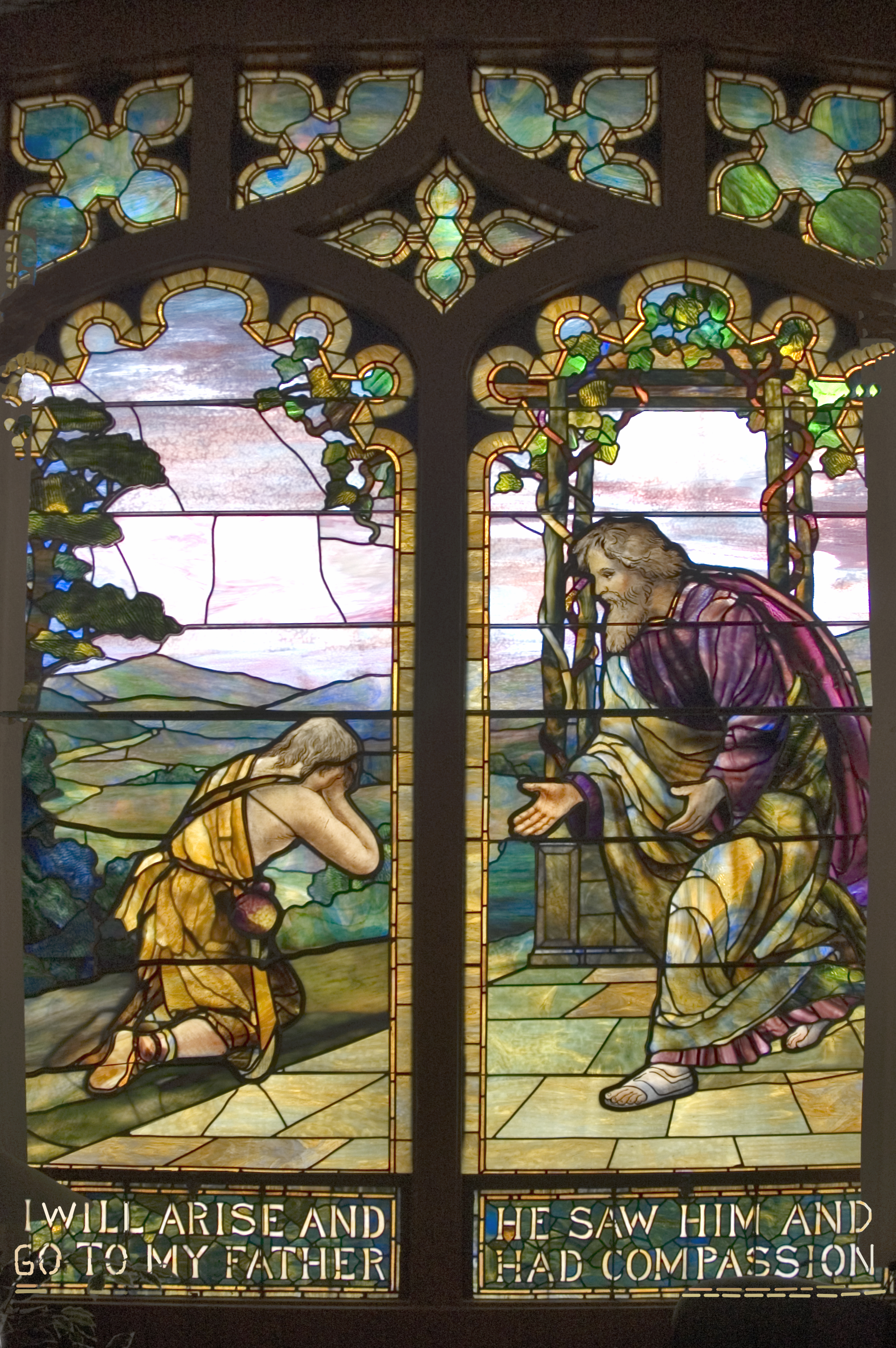
Stained glass window by Sellers in the chapel of The Bowery Mission

Benjamin Sellers (1860–1930) was a stained glass artisan in the Northeastern US. He was a practitioner of the opalescent style of stained glass popularized by John La Farge and Louis Comfort Tiffany in the late 19th century.

Sellers moved from Birmingham, England to the US in 1882. He worked at the Tiffany Glass manufacture in Jersey City for 10 years. After 1892, Sellers started his own studio, Benjamin Sellers & Sons, which provided a wide variety of ecclesiastical and domestic stained glass. Advertisements for Benjamin Sellers & Sons frequently mention custom memorial windows and interior decorations.

Sellers' work gained widespread praise among his contemporaries and he was frequently commissioned by wealthy parishes to design custom windows. His work can be found in the Annunciation Greek Orthodox Church (Manhattan), First Presbyterian Church of Newtown, Sayville Congregational Church, Second Congregational Church of Winstead, and First Memorial Presbyterian Church of Dover, New Jersey among others. One of his most notable creations is the depiction of the Parable of the Prodigal Son story on the exterior facade of The Bowery Mission.

After Sellers retired the work was carried on by his son until the firm closed in 1920.
