= Bushkill, Pennsylvania =

Unincorporated community in Pennsylvania, US

- Unincorporated community
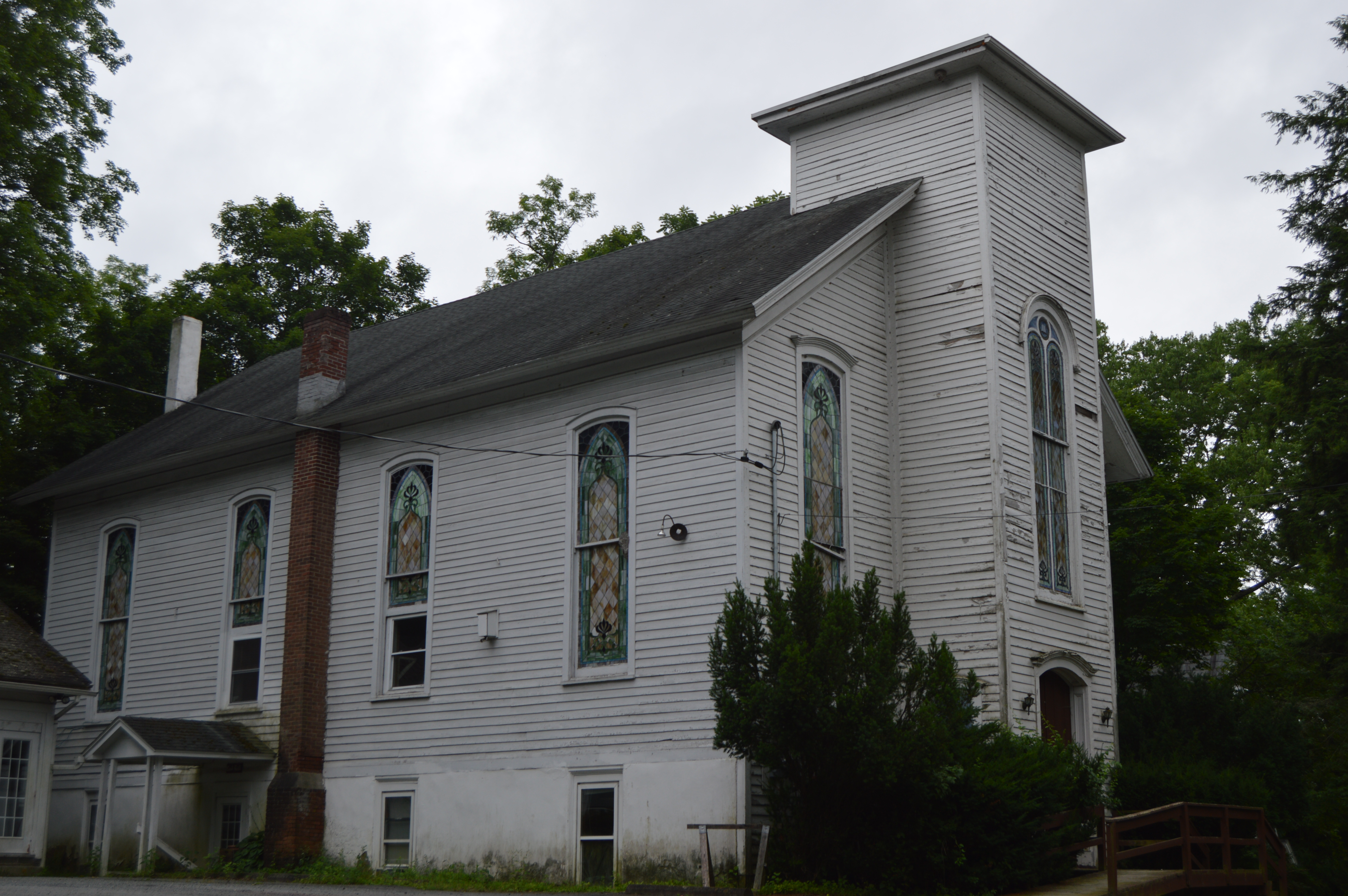
- Former Bushkill Dutch Reformed Church

- Location within Pennsylvania
- Coordinates: 41°05′36″N 75°00′07″W
- Country: United States
- State: Pennsylvania
- County: Pike
- Township: Lehman
- Elevation: 377 ft (115 m)
- Time zone: UTC-5 (Eastern (EST))
  - Summer (DST): UTC-4 (EDT)
- ZIP codes: 18324, 18371
- Area codes: 570 and 272
- GNIS feature ID: 1170770

Bushkill is an unincorporated community in Pike County, Pennsylvania, United States.

Portions of Bushkill were seized by the United States government during the controversial Tocks Island Dam project and are now part of the Delaware Water Gap National Recreation Area.

Bushkill's transportation options are somewhat limited. It is served by Monroe County Transit Authority's Yellow Line, and the Port Jervis Station just above the border of the State of New York and Pennsylvania, where U.S. Route 209 enters New York. The station is the terminal station of Metro-North Railroad's Port Jervis Line, and it is operated by NJ Transit. NJ Transit plans to reopen the East Stroudsburg Station in nearby East Stroudsburg.

== Notable people ==
- Frank Schoonover - American artist who maintained a summer studio on Little Bushkill Creek
- Harold Auten - awarded the Victoria Cross in 1918 for sinking a German U-boat, lived in Bushkill for thirty years, where he owned a hotel and cinema.

== See also ==
- Camp Tamiment
- Mont Lawn Camp
