= Jerry McAuley =

American missionary (1839–1884)

- Born: Jeremiah McAuley; 1839; County Kerry, Ireland
- Died: September 18, 1884 (aged 44–45); New York City, New York
- Occupation: Missionary
- Known for: Founder of the New York City Rescue Mission
- Spouse: Maria Fahy

Jeremiah McAuley (1839 – September 18, 1884), along with his wife, Maria McAuley (née Fahy), founded the McAuley Water Street Mission (now the New York City Rescue Mission) in Lower Manhattan. Known as the "apostle for the lost," McAuley was a former "street thief" who found religion while spending seven years in Sing Sing prison during the 1860s. He started the first rescue mission to feed and shelter the poor who were mostly immigrants, leading to the creation of over 300 rescue missions in the United States.

== Early life ==
McAuley was born in County Kerry, Ireland in 1839. While McAuley was an infant, his father abandoned the family to escape law enforcement officers pursuing him for counterfeiting. Jerry's mother sent him off to live with his grandmother. He did not go to school and was prone to mischief. When he was 13, McAuley was sent to live with his sister and her husband in New York City. He said that arrangement did not last, and soon he boarded with a family in the slums of Water Street on the Lower East Side. He became a thief to fund clothing and alcohol, evolving into a "river thief" who stole from boats at night. Later he said, “Stealing came natural and easy. A bigger nuisance and loafer never stepped above ground.”

== Prison ==
For his childhood petty crimes, McAuley spent time, ranging from days to months, at the local jailhouse. In 1857 when he was 19 years old, McAuley was falsely accused of highway robbery. He was convicted and sent to Sing-Sing Prison for fifteen years and 3 months. Sing Sing was A maximum security prison, Sing Sing's cells were 7 ft long, 3 ft 3 in wide, and 6 ft by 7 in high. Despite the prison's prohibition on talking, McAuley was able work in the carpet weaving shop and learned to read.

His fifth year in prison, McAuley heard a man by the name of Orville Gardner testify of his conversion to Christianity and was brought to tears. He got permission to use the prison library and sought religious readings. After about a month, a female missionary visited the prison and prayed with McAuley. Although he would continue to have challenges with alcohol and crime, McAuley considered that night as "his conversion to Christ." On March 8, 1864, aged 26, McAuley was pardoned and set free.

== Rescue mission ==
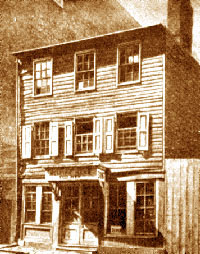
316 Water St Mission House

Once out of prison, McAuley wanted "a sober and righteous life", but soon fell back to crime. McAuley's faith was reinvigorated by Water Street missionaries, and he began to work honest jobs between 1870 and 1872, saving and raising money to start a mission.

McAuley met Alfrederick Smith Hatch, a banker and later president of the stock exchange, who became McAuley's benefactor. In October 1872, Hatch donated a property on Water Street, and McAuley used the money he had raised to repair the building. Soon after, the mission at 316 Water Street named "Helping Hand for Men" was open, but soon had a name change to McAuley's Water Street Mission. The purpose of the Mission was "to provide food, shelter, clothing and hope to people in crisis."

In 1882, after twelve years, McAuley left the Water Street Mission to the care of others and opened Jerry McAuley's Cremorne Mission near Times Square, which focused on women in need, especially prostitutes and other fallen women.

== Personal ==
In 1872, McAuley married Maria Fahy a former prostitute who also had been "rescued from a life of degradation."

In September 1884, McAuley died from tuberculosis he contracted while in Sing Sing. His widow continued his work running the Cremorne Mission. In 1892, she married architect Bradford Gilbert who had been a supporter of McAuley and a trustee of the mission.

== Honors ==
In June 1911, Bradford Gilbert donated a yacht named the Jerry McAuley to The Salvation Army to give them access to sailors on ships. Bradford spoke at the dedication of the yacht, as did a Mrs. Whittemore who told of her conversion by McAuley. Bradford said that McAuley was "the missing link between what the church thought it could do and what God could really do."
