= Harvey Fisk =

American investment banker (1831–1890)

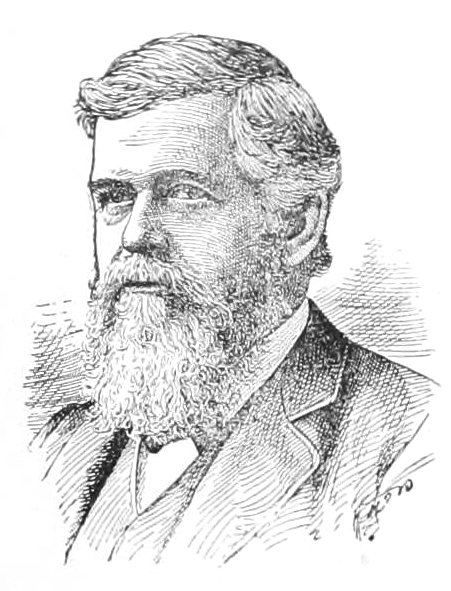
- Born: April 26, 1831; New Haven, Addison County, Vermont
- Died: November 8, 1890 (aged 59); Wilburtha, Mercer County, New Jersey
- Resting place: First Presbyterian Church of Ewing Cemetery
- Occupation: Investment banker
- Children: Harvey Edward Fisk
- Parents: Joel Fisk (father); Clarinda Chapman Fisk (mother)

Harvey Fisk (April 26, 1831 – November 8, 1890) was an American investment banker who founded Fisk & Hatch along with Alfrederick Smith Hatch.

== Life ==
Fisk was born in Vermont to Joel Fisk (1796–1856) and Clarinda Chapman Fisk (1803–1878). Fisk began his career as a clerk in a dried goods store located in Trenton, New Jersey. He married Louisa Green in 1853 and had seven children. His oldest child was Harvey Edward Fisk.

In March 1862, Fisk began a finance and insurance company called, Fisk & Hatch with Alfrederick Smith Hatch. The company initially focused almost exclusively in government bonds. Both men were short on capital at the time and relied on $15,000 worth of loans from family and friends. Fisk and Hatch found success as sub-agents for Jay Cooke & Company, popularizing and selling millions of dollars in government war securities in New York and New England. The two quickly became the front rank of bond dealers. Fisk's son, Harvey Edward Fisk, joined the company in 1877.

In March 1885 the partnership of Fisk & Hatch was dissolved. On March 26, 1885, the firm reorganized under the name of Harvey Fisk & Sons in connection with his three oldest sons. The company sold over $50 million in bonds to the United States government during the Grover Cleveland's administration and the same amount during the first two years of Benjamin Harrison's administration.

== Death ==
Fisk died on November 8, 1890, at the age of 59.

In 1918, the Fisk estate, "Riverside" in Ewing Township, New Jersey, was purchased, through a gift of James Cox Brady, by the Roman Catholic Diocese of Trenton. Bishop Thomas J. Walsh donated the property to the Religious Teachers Filippini for a motherhouse and novitiate. A girls' school, Villa Victoria Academy is located on the premises.
