= Mont Lawn Camp =

Summer camp in Bushkill, Pennsylvania, U.S.

Coordinates: 41°07′09″N 75°01′12″W

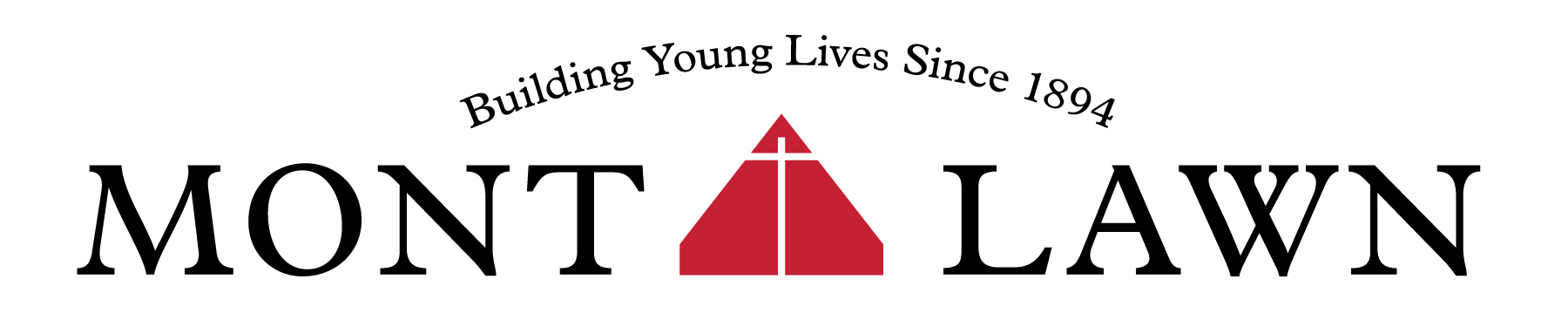

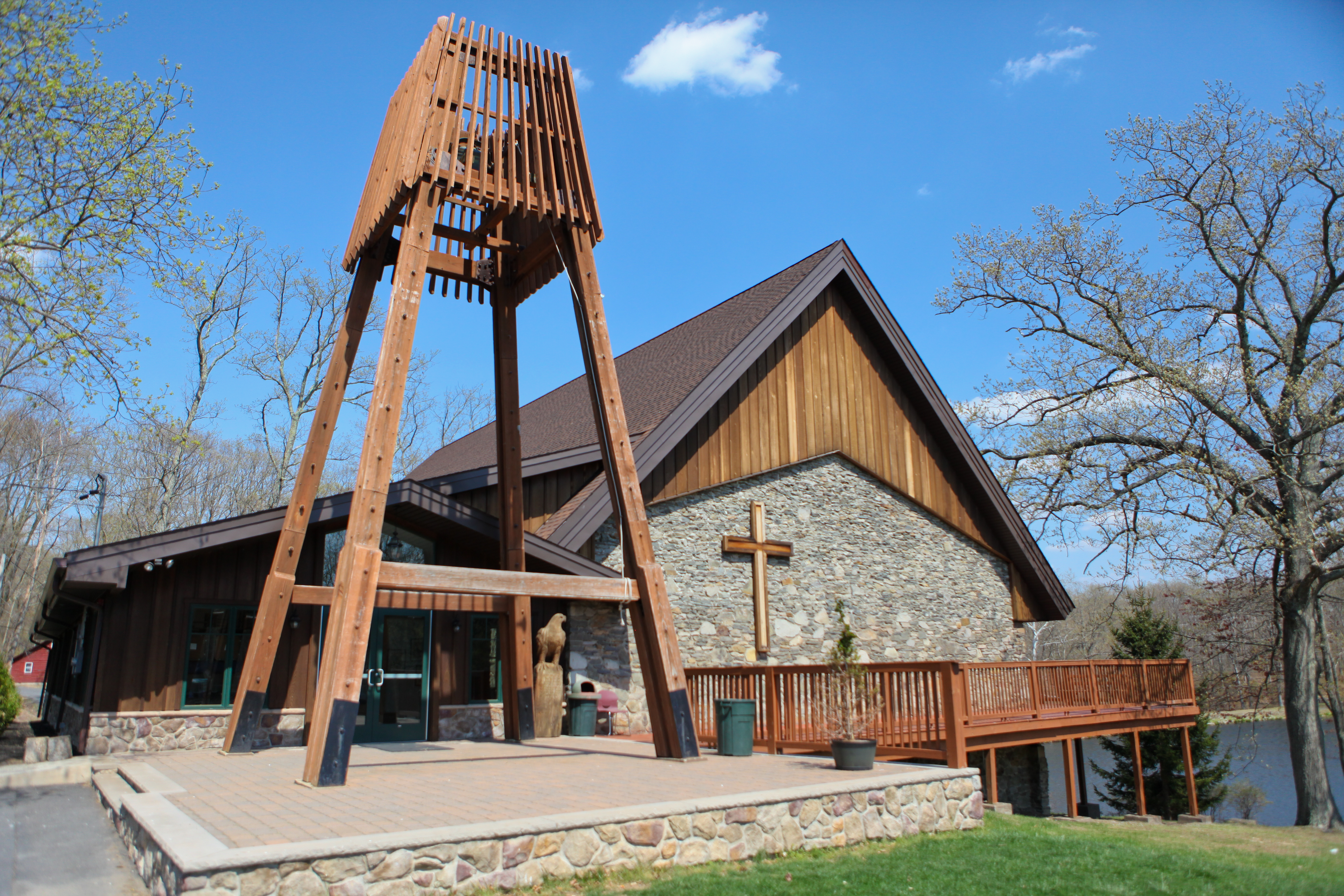
- Diebold Chapel at Mont Lawn Camp
- Formation: 1894
- Registration no.: 13-1617086
- Key people: Thomas Jones, Director
- Parent organization: The Bowery Mission
- Affiliations: ACA
- Formerly called: Christian Herald Children's Home

Mont Lawn Camp is a 200-acre summer camp located in the Pocono Mountains in Bushkill, Pennsylvania. Every summer it serves as a sleep-away camp for hundreds of children from underserved neighborhoods in the New York metro area and Philadelphia.

Mont Lawn Camp is owned and operated by The Bowery Mission and is accredited by the American Camping Association and the ECFA. In the offseason the camp is used as a retreat center for church and corporate groups.

== Facilities and activities ==
Mont Lawn Camp is located adjacent to the Delaware Water Gap National Recreation Area and includes 43 buildings, a large lake, pool, chapel, barn and a dining hall. Available activities at Mont Lawn Camp include rock wall, hiking, archery, canoeing, challenge course, and swimming.

The Fort Plenty dining hall operates with support from parent organization The Bowery Mission in New York City. The Diebold Chapel, first dedicated in 1963, was fully renovated in 2007.

== History ==
In 1894, the Christian Herald established a children's home at Mont Lawn in Upper Nyack, NY to serve children from immigrant families living on the Lower East Side. The first children arrived on by horse-drawn wagonettes after voyaging up the river on the Steamboat Crystenah.

Mont Lawn was the estate of the Rev. Lawrence Jewett, who had been pastor of the First Reformed Church of Piermont in the 1850s. In 1898, the Christian Herald bought the property and incorporated the camp as the Christian Herald Children's Home Association.

On July 4, 1905, a ceremony was held to dedicate a new Children's Temple with Jacob Riis as the chief speaker.

In response to encroaching suburbanization the camp moved to its current home in the Poconos Region of Pennsylvania in 1961. Alfred P. Hampton, known affectionately as "Mr. Al," served as director from 1972 to 1989, after first serving as a camp counselor in 1950.

After the Herald ceased publication in 1992, Mont Lawn Camp continued under the ownership and operation of The Bowery Mission.
