= Christian Herald =

American weekly newspaper

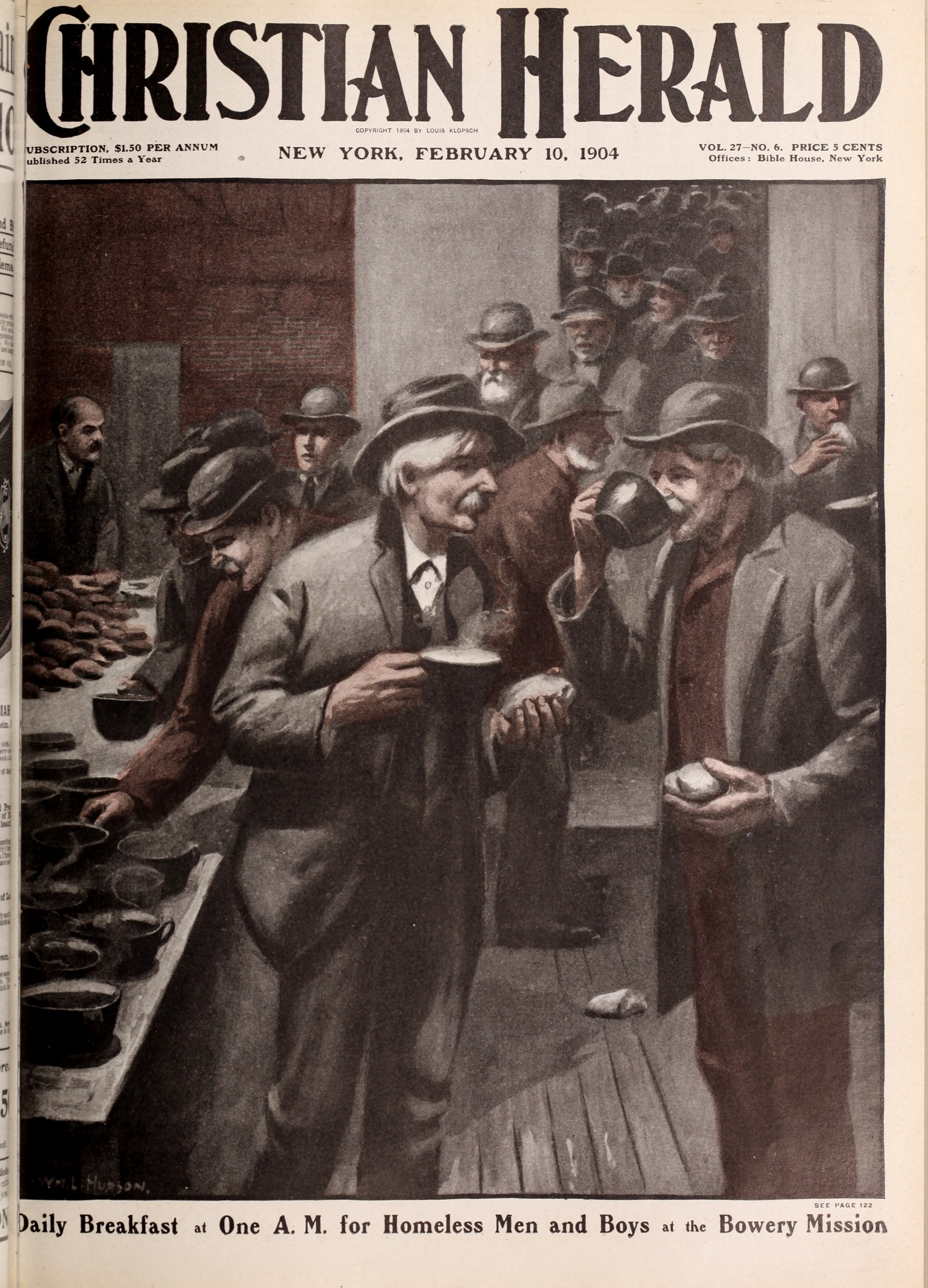
- February 10, 1904 cover depicting the breadline at The Bowery Mission.
- Type: Weekly newspaper
- Founder: Joseph Spurgeon
- Founded: 1878
- Ceased publication: 1992
- Language: English
- Country: United States

The Christian Herald was an American weekly newspaper reporting on topics relevant to Evangelical Christianity, with an emphasis on engaging with humanitarian causes at home and abroad. It was inspired by the London-based newspaper which ceased publication in 2006.

Under the leadership of Louis Klopsch, the Herald sponsored a variety of domestic ministries, including The Bowery Mission and Mont Lawn Camp.

== History ==
A take on the London-based newspaper of the same name, the American Herald was started in 1878 in New York City by business manager Joseph Spurgeon (a cousin of Charles H. Spurgeon) and editor Dr. B. J. Fernie after they conceived the idea with Rev. Michael P. Baxter, the founder of the original London-based paper. Along with the newspaper, Spurgeon also ran a charity under the same auspices devoted to poor relief and evangelizing. Thomas De Witt Talmage served as editor from 1890 to 1902.

In 1898, the Herald was purchased by Louis Klopsch, who further expanded the charitable operations and spread the publication to overseas locations.

In 1927, Reverend Daniel A. Poling became the editor, a post he held until 1966. In 1948, the Herald started the "Family Bookshelf," a book subscription group of Christian-friendly literature.

Declining circulation forced the Herald to relocate from Manhattan to Chappaqua, New York, in 1971. By 1992, the newspaper ceased publication, but the charitable outreach arm still exists, having relocated back to Manhattan in 1998.

In the early months of 2006, the Christian Herald, having ceased any and all publications, was dissolved. Its continued impact on The Bowery Mission in New York City has been cited as one of its "most significant and enduring effects" of its humanitarian commitments.

== Notable people ==
- Louis Klopsch, proprietor
- Thomas De Witt Talmage, editor
- Sara Jane Crafts (1845–1930), contributor, editor, The Christian Herald
