= Blue Letter Bible =

Study Bible on CD and a website

The Blue Letter Bible (BLB) project is an initiative of Sowing Circle, a United States–based, non-denominational Christian ministry that has created a study Bible and Bible study tools stated to "make reading, searching and studying the Bible easy and rewarding". The study Bible and associated resources are provided in CD format, via Internet, and via apps. Sowing Circle, a California 501(c)(3) Private Operating Foundation, was founded in November 1995. The Project supports 12 English Bible translations, Hebrew and the Septuagint for the Old Testament, and the Greek Textus Receptus and Westcott-Hort versions for the New Testament. Integrated study tools include Gesenius' Lexicon for the Old Testament, and Thayer's Lexicon for the New Testament, as well as English and Strong's Concordances for the entire Bible. Dozens of Biblical commentaries are also available.

A series of free instructional videos, titled Introducing the Blue Letter Bible, is available on YouTube. There are also Blue Letter Bible Android and iPhone mobile apps.

The Blue Letter Bible is so called because of the blue color of the hyperlinks. The name "Blue Letter Bible" also contrasts with the term "red letter Bible", which is a common form of printed Bible with key words, such as the words of Jesus, highlighted in red.

== BLB content ==
A content disclaimer on the Blue Letter Bible website's "About" page reads:

CONTENT DISCLAIMER: The Blue Letter Bible ministry and the BLB Institute hold to the historical, conservative Christian faith, which includes a firm belief in the inerrancy of Scripture. Since the text and audio content provided by BLB represent a range of evangelical traditions, all of the ideas and principles conveyed in the resource materials are not necessarily affirmed, in total, by this ministry.

Sixty-six books of the Protestant Bible are listed on a Blue Letter Bible Web site.

The Blue Letter Bible (BLB) Project had three initiatives ongoing as of November 2006:

- The BLB CD for gratis distribution to missionaries, pastors, and students, e.g., via Calvary Chapel Magazine, a publisher and affiliate ministry of Calvary Chapel's with missionary emphasis, which has distributed over 45,000 BLB CDs to their readership worldwide, and Koinonia House, publishers of Personal Update (whose monthly distribution exceeds 100,000), which offers free distribution of the BLB CD to their subscribers.
- The BLB website for online Bible study, which in 3rd quarter 2006 had over 3,500,000 hyperlink cross-references and three adverts on the right hand sidebar, daily average page views exceeding 375,000, and over 1,250 independent websites distributing BLB internet content through BLB search tools embedded within their websites.
- The BLB Institute for structured Biblical studies, which offered free-of-charge registration and had over 28,000 registered students in 3rd quarter 2006.

== See also ==
- Biblical software
