= Thomas De Witt Talmage =

19th-century American Presbyterian preacher

The Reverend Thomas De Witt Talmage
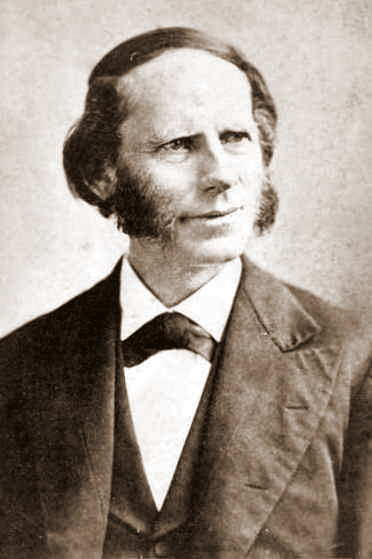
- Talmage circa 1870
- Born: January 7, 1832; Bound Brook, New Jersey, United States
- Died: April 12, 1902 (aged 70); Washington, D.C.
- Resting place: Green-Wood Cemetery
- Occupation: Preacher
- Known for: Prominent Presbyterian preacher, clergyman and reformer during the mid-to late 19th century.
- Spouses: Mary R. Avery (m. 1856–1861) Susan Whittemore (m. 1863–1895) Eleanor Collier (m. 1898–1902)
- Children: 7 children
- Relatives: John Van Nest Talmage, brother

Thomas De Witt Talmage (January 7, 1832 – April 12, 1902) was a preacher, clergyman and divine in the United States who held pastorates in the Reformed Church in America and Presbyterian Church. He was one of the most prominent religious leaders in the United States during the mid- to late-19th century, equaled as a pulpit orator perhaps only by Henry Ward Beecher. He also preached to crowds in England. During the 1860s and 70s, Talmage was a well-known reformer in New York City and was often involved in crusades against vice and crime.

During the last years of his life, Talmage ceased preaching and devoted himself to editing, writing, and lecturing. At different periods he was editor of the Christian at Work (1873–76), New York; the Advance (1877–79), Chicago; Frank Leslie's Sunday Magazine (1879–89), New York; and the Christian Herald (1890–1902), New York. Each week he was said to have preached to audiences of 8,000 people, and for many years his sermons were published regularly in more than 3,000 journals, through which he was said to reach 25,000,000 readers.

== Biography ==
=== Early life and education ===
T. De Witt Talmage was born in what is now Franklin Township, Somerset County, New Jersey and he was a member of the Reformed Church of Bound Brook (located on Main Street in South Bound Brook) and always had a close association to South Bound Brook. His ancestors included some of the earliest Dutch families who settled in New York. His father's ancestors came from Barton Stacy, England, and included founders of Southampton and East Hampton, New York.

Talmage earned an undergraduate degree at the University of the City of New York (now New York University). Following his graduation in 1853, Talmage studied law for a time before deciding on entering the ministry. He studied theology at the Reformed Dutch Theological Seminary in New Brunswick, New Jersey.

Four of his brothers also entered the ministry, all of them earning the title Doctor of Divinity. John Van Nest Talmage was a missionary in China, while his brothers James and Goyn Talmage became noted preachers in their own right. The fifth brother Daniel Talmage was a successful merchant.

== Pastoral career ==
Talmage began preaching in Belleville, New Jersey once he graduated in 1856. He spent two years at a pastorate in Syracuse, New York before moving in 1862 to Philadelphia to become the pastor for the Second Reformed Dutch Church. (In 1867 the denomination changed its name to the Reformed Church in America.) It was here that Talmage began to establish a reputation as a gifted orator and preacher. He also served as a chaplain for the Union Army during the American Civil War.

=== Philadelphia and the Reformed Dutch Church ===
Under his guidance, the church grew from a minor congregation to one of the most powerful and influential institutions in the city. Talmage began attracting large crowds almost from the time of his arrival. Despite his being called a "pulpit clown" and "mountebank" for his sensational sermons, Talmage attracted a growing audience. The church could no longer seat everyone who attended. Larger and wealthier congregations began to recruit him and in 1869, Talmage accepted an offer from the Central Presbyterian Church in Brooklyn, New York.

== Marriage and family ==
His first wife, Mary R. Avery, was from Brooklyn. They had two children together before she drowned in the Schuylkill River in Philadelphia on June 7, 1861.

In May 1863, Talmage married Susan Whittemore of Greenpoint, New York, a neighborhood of Brooklyn. They had five children together. Upon Susan's death after 32 years of marriage, Talmage inherited most of her estate, estimated at $200,000.

In January 1898, about three years after his wife died, Talmage married a third time, to 40-year-old Eleanor Collier of Allegheny City, Pennsylvania. Collier was a wealthy young widow, having been married to the late Judge Charles W. Collier. She was 27 years younger than Talmage.

=== Brooklyn and the Central Presbyterian Church ===
The interior of the Brooklyn Tabernacle, which burned in 1872. The text accompanying this 1873 engraving says, "It was one of the best buildings in the country for speaking and hearing, and was unsurpassed in its arrangements for seating a large congregation."

Once settled in Brooklyn, Talmage continued his dramatic services with even greater success than before. An example of one of his colorful performances was reported by a newspaper of the era:

One Sunday morning when the time came for him to deliver his sermon, he walked to the extreme edge on one side of his fifty-foot platform, faced about, then suddenly started as fast as he could jump for the opposite side. Just as everybody in the congregation, breathless, expected to see him pitch headlong from the further side of the platform he leaped suddenly in the air and came down with a crash, shouting, "Young man, you are rushing towards a precipice". And then he delivered a moving sermon upon the temptations and sins of youth in a big city.

Attending Talmage's sermons became one of the most popular religious experiences of the era. In 1870, the congregation built a tabernacle solely to accommodate the large crowds who attended his church services. The building was built over an old church structure then being used as a Sunday School. The demand for his sermons helped with the raising of funds, and construction was completed in only three months. Although the tabernacle had been built to seat large crowds, seating was free of charge and hundreds were turned away every Sunday.

The original tabernacle was destroyed in a fire in December 1872, then regarded as one of the worst in Brooklyn's history. Talmage and his congregation met at the Brooklyn Academy of Music until they built a newer and larger tabernacle in 1874. The building featured semicircular seating to provide an unobstructed view, accommodating 5,000 people. Talmage continued to preach with great success for several more years. When the second tabernacle was destroyed in a fire in 1889, the congregation became convinced there was "a fatality about the location." They built a third tabernacle at a new location at Clinton Avenue and Greene Avenue, rather than in Schermerhorn Street. After the third tabernacle was destroyed by a fire in 1894, Talmage announced his decision to retire from holding a regular pastorate in favor of taking up an evangelist practice.

=== Later years ===
Talmage changed his mind to accept an offer to join the First Presbyterian Church in Washington, D.C. He was the co-pastor with Byron Sunderland for three years and then pastor for one year. Although he continued to attract large crowds, they did not express the same enthusiasm as that of his Philadelphia or Brooklyn congregations. This may have been due to the more conservative attitudes of Washington residents. Increasingly interested in writing about religion, Talmage resigned on March 9, 1899. His writings, published in magazines and newspapers, were estimated to have reached millions of readers.

His sermons were regularly printed in newspapers across the country. The performance aspect was lost in print, however. In addition, tastes were changing. Talmage's popularity began to wane after his resignation from the pastorate in 1899.

=== Death ===
In early 1902, Talmage vacationed in Mexico for six weeks to recover from influenza. By the time he returned to Washington, he had become seriously ill. His condition was not considered life-threatening until the first week of April. The immediate cause of his death on April 12 was inflammation of the brain.

Three days later, his body was brought to the Church of the Covenant, where a quiet funeral service was held. Those who assisted included Teunis S. Hamlin of the Church of the Covenant; Thomas Chalmers of the Eastern Presbyterian Church of Washington; St. Louis preacher and lifelong friend Samuel J. Nicols; and former classmates E.P. Terhune, Howard Suydam and James Demarest. His death received international attention, and condolence messages were sent to the family from England, Russia and other countries. Talmage was buried in the family plot at Green-Wood Cemetery in Brooklyn.

== Works ==
- Earth Girdled:The World as Seen Today. Hunt and Eaton Publishing, H.S. Smith Publishing, C. F. Beezley And Co., 1896.
- The Masque Torn Off. Chicago: Fairbanks, Palmer & Co., 1883.
- Social Dynamite; or the Wickedness of Modern Society. 3rd ed. (1889)
- Introduction to Rev. A. Stewart Walsh, D.D., Mary: The Queen of the House of David and Mother of Jesus. (1889)
- Night Scenes of City Life. (1891) Accessed January 2, 2013.
- Talmage in the Holy Land. Chicago: Rhodes & McClure Publishing Co., 1890
- Pathway of Life. Historical Publishing Company, 1894
- Crumbs Swept Up by T Dewitt Talmage published by William B. Evans & Co. 1870
- The Abominations of Modern Society by Rev. T. De Witt Talmage, published by Adams, Victor & Co. 1872.
- Old Wells Dug Out: Being a Third Series of Sermons, Harper & Brothers (US), 1874
- Sin: A Series of Popular Discourses. Chicago: Rhodes & McClure Publishing Co., 1897
- From Manger to Throne. Philadelphia: Historical Publishing Company, 1893
