= Fisk & Hatch =

American finance and insurance company

- Company type: Banking
- Industry: Finance and insurance
- Founded: March 1, 1862
- Founder: Harvey Fisk; Alfrederick Smith Hatch
- Fate: Dissolved March 1885 and reorganized into Harvey Fisk & Sons
- Headquarters: 5 Nassau St; New York City, New York, U.S.
- Services: Investment

Fisk & Hatch was an American finance and insurance company formed in 1862. They had offices at 5 Nassau St in New York City. During the Civil War the firm floated many millions of dollars' worth of government bonds, reviving the public credit and confidence beyond all anticipation, and aiding greatly in placing the national finances upon a firm foundation.

== History ==
Harvey Fisk and Alfrederick Smith Hatch formed Fisk & Hatch on March 1, 1862, after several years in the financial industry. Acting as special agents of Jay Cooke & Co., Mr. Fisk's firm obtained within one month's time nearly $170,000,000 for the U.S. Government. In 1865-68 Mr. Fisk's firm successfully negotiated $27,855,000 worth of government subsidy bonds issued in aid of the Union Pacific and Central Pacific railroads, and placed $53,000,000 worth of bonds issued by the Central Pacific company itself.

Fisk & Hatch became famous for their handling of Government bonds. They were also connected with the Chesapeake & Ohio Railway Company, of which Collis P. Huntington was president.

On May 14, 1884, Fisk & Hatch suspended payment. Two days previous, Hatch had been elected president of the New York Stock Exchange. Upon his firm's suspension he instantly resigned the office. When Fisk & Hatch failed for more than $8,000,000, in 1873, it was by reason of a debt of $2,651,000 owed the house by the Chesapeake & Ohio Railroad. This also caused the failure of the Newark Savings Institution, which had kept a large amount of securities on deposit with Fisk & Hatch. The firm never resumed business, but its members did. Mr. Hatch was reinstated in the privileges of the Exchange on June 6, 1884.

In March 1885 the partnership of Fisk & Hatch was dissolved, and the firm reorganized under the name of Harvey Fisk & Sons.
