= Mary Randlett =

American photographer (1924–2019)

Mary Randlett (May 5, 1924 – January 17, 2019) was an American photographer who created hundreds of photographs in five categories: architecture, nature, Northwest School artists, Northwest writers, and public art. Her work is notable for her documentation of the artists who created the Northwest School, such as Kenneth Callahan, Morris Graves, and Mark Tobey.

== Early years ==
Born in 1924 at Seattle's General Hospital, her father Cecil Durand Willis ran a blueprint company while her mother Elizabeth Bayley was in the arts and crafts business. It was thanks to her mother that she developed an interest in Northwest artists from the 1930s and interacted with photographers including George Mantor, Minor White, Imogen Cunningham and Hans Jorgensen.

She attended but did not graduate from Queen Anne High School, before receiving a B.A. degree at Whitman College in 1947. While at Whitman, she was an active photographer, often to be found in the Billings darkroom developing her own films.

== Career ==
"My life is my work; my work is my life." M. Randlett (1996)

After graduating, she spent a short period working in a Seattle store before apprenticing with the fashion photographer Hans Jorgensen although she later explained that it was George Mantor who actually introduced her to the art of portraiture. In 1949, with her Rollei camera, she shot pictures of the Slo-Mo-Shun IV, the world's fastest boat at the time. Thanks to the success of her images, she was able to embark on a career in photography. Her real breakthrough came in 1963 when she photographed Theodore Roethke two weeks before he died. The following year she began to work under an agreement with the University of Washington Press where she took countless photographs for books on Northwest art, artists, landscapes and architecture.

Much of her work was devoted to photographing artists from the Northwest. They included Kenneth Callahan, William Cumming, Ambrose and Viola Patterson, Guy Anderson, William Ivey, Allan Wright, Philip McCracken, Eustace Ziegler and Neil Meitzler. In 1983, she was photoeditor for William Cumming's memoirs: Sketchbook: A Memoir of the 1930s and the Northwest School.

Collections of her works are located at more than three dozen major institutions, such as the Metropolitan Museum of Art, Smithsonian Institution, and University of Washington's Allen Library. She has held more than 30 solo exhibitions, and is a recipient of the Anne Gould Hauberg Artist Images Award. The University of Washington Libraries holds the copyright to all Mary Randlett's photographs.

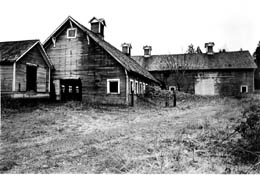
Randlett's photo of the Elliot Dairy Farm (1992)
