= William Ivey (painter) =

American painter

William Ivey (September 30, 1919 – May 17, 1992) was an American abstract expressionist painter, sometimes associated with the Northwest School of artists. After stints in the US Army and studying art in California, he spent most of his career in Seattle, Washington. Seattle Times critic Deloris Tarzan Ament described him as "the Dean of Northwest Painters".

Untitled, 1986, William Ivey. Collection of Woodside/Braseth Gallery.

== Life and career ==
William Ivey was descended from early immigrants to the city of Seattle, where he was born on September 30, 1919. Both his parents died when he was young, and he and a younger sister were raised mainly by their maternal grandfather, who was a land developer, and an aunt. Young Ivey often visited the Seattle Art Museum after its 1933 opening near his grandfather's house, in the Capitol Hill neighborhood. After graduating from Broadway High School he attended the University of Washington as a law student, while also taking drawing classes at the Cornish College of the Arts. He gradually become more interested in pursuing a career in art, which he'd enjoyed since youth.

His studies were interrupted by the Second World War. Ivey went into the Army, trained as a commando in the First Special Service Force, and served in the Aleutians, Africa, Italy, and France. In later years he seldom spoke of his wartime experiences, but was known to have sustained a serious abdominal wound. While in Italy he was able to view works by Giotto, Michelangelo, and Caravaggio. After the war Ivey spent three years at the California School of Fine Art in San Francisco, where he undertook serious study of modern art with such influential instructors as Clyfford Still, Mark Rothko, Ad Reinhardt, David Park, and Clay Spohn. Friends and fellow students included noted painters Richard Diebenkorn and Frank Lobdell.

In the late 1940s Ivey returned to Seattle. He was employed by the city as a social worker, and had a daughter with his wife, Helen Taylor. He painted at night in a series of studios, and entered the Seattle Art Museum's Northwest Annual and the Henry Art Gallery's Northwest Invitational shows. He sold his first painting to collector and gallery owner Zoe Dusanne. In 1954 Ivey, Jack Stangle, Ward Corley, and Richard Gilkey were featured in an exhibition of Northwest avant-gardists at SAM. He formed friendships with fellow artists such as Guy Anderson, Leo Kenney, and Carl and Hilda Morris. In the late 1950s he opened the short-lived Artist's Gallery, Seattle's first co-operative artist-owned gallery, with Alden Mason, James FitzGerald, Margaret Tomkins, and others. In 1960, Gordon Woodside became his representative; the same year he received a Ford Foundation grant, and two years later, a grant from the National Foundation for the Arts and Humanities. In 1964 he had his first major solo show, at the Seattle Art Museum; in 1967 he received a Rockefeller Fellowship.

While Ivey was gaining recognition, and was able to quit his day job, he was notorious for his reluctance to attend opening parties, do publicity, or seek out commissions, and for his gruff, workmanlike approach to painting. "Painting is something you have to do all the time," he told arts journalist Regina Hackett in a 1992 interview. "If you don't, it becomes too important, too charged with meaning, and you can't bring yourself to do it. For me, it's like tying my shoes in a way."

Green Forest, 1981, William Ivey. Collection of Woodside/Braseth Gallery.

Ivey also generally disliked teaching, but taught for short periods at the San Francisco Art Institute, Reed College, and Highline Community College, and also gave private lessons for small groups at a studio he shared with painter Frank Okada in downtown Seattle.

Distaste for promotion likely limited Ivey's popularity – his one and only European exhibition, arranged by painter John Franklin Koenig, was at the Galerie Arnaud in Paris in 1966 – but he remained a respected, strong-selling artist in the Pacific Northwest. SAM held another solo show of his work in 1975; in 1982 he accepted a rare commission and created the largest painting of his career (20' x 8') for the King County District Court in Issaquah, Washington; in 1983 he was named Artist of the Year by the King County (Washington) Arts Commission, and used the $25,000 reward to build a studio behind his home in Seattle's Queen Anne neighborhood; in 1989 the Henry Art Gallery presented a major retrospective of his career.

Ivey was acquainted with Mark Tobey, Morris Graves, and other members of the 'Northwest School', and was close friends with Richard Gilkey and many of the Skagit Valley-based painters who were considered by some critics to represent a second generation of the Northwest School. However, his deeply personal style of abstraction showed more of the influence of Still, Rothko, and others he studied under at the California School of Fine Arts. He found inspiration in observation of the real world, but his intense immersion in the painting process transformed what he saw into lush abstractions that emphasized color and the picture plane. In Ivey's paintings, shapes are secondary to color in the development of spaces, and delicate neutral grays set off glowing patches of bright color.

In a 2014 review of a show at the Woodside/Braseth Gallery, arts journalist Matthew Kangas speculated that Ivey's wartime experiences may have had a strong impact on his art, and suggested that "[perhaps] Ivey channeled — or suppressed — such horrors into modernist abstraction in order to control and tame them."

Ivey rarely titled his paintings. He was an avid fly fisherman, often fishing with his friend and fellow painter Carl Morris.

He died in Seattle on May 17, 1992, aged 72, after a year-and-a-half long battle with cancer. He was survived by his wife Helen, daughter Kathleen, and two grandchildren.

Said journalist Hackett, "Ivey was a rough-hewn yet lyrical painter interested in feeling, not fact. Within the frame of a canvas, he painted a frame with colors pouring out. He wanted to capture the visual pulse of a scene without bogging it down in particulars. [...] He wanted to chip the barnacle of language off purely visual sensations. By blurring them, he hoped to restore them to some kind of original fresh sight. Thus, for all his disclaimers and tough-guy fortitude, he was a romantic to his bones."
