= Richard Gilkey =

American painter

Richard Gilkey (1925 – 1997)

Richard Charles Gilkey (December 20, 1925 – October 3, 1997) was an American painter, often associated with the 'Northwest School' of artists. During his long career he became one of the most acclaimed painters in the Pacific Northwest, with an original and highly distinctive style. He was particularly well known for his landscapes depicting the Skagit Valley in western Washington.

== Early life ==
Gilkey was born in Bellingham, Washington, on December 20, 1925, and spent his first six years in British Columbia, Canada, where his father worked in the logging industry as a timber cruiser, identifying and marking trees to be cut down. The family then returned to Washington's Skagit Valley region (where Gilkey's paternal great-grandfather and maternal grandfather had been early residents), living in March Point, a small town near Anacortes. When Richard was twelve, his family moved to Seattle, where he and his brother Tom, who was two years older, attended Ballard High School. There he enjoyed art classes with Orre Nobles, and showed an aptitude for sketching. This would be his only formal art education.

On December 8, 1941, the day after the Pearl Harbor attack, Tom Gilkey enlisted in the Marine Corps, and Richard, at age 17, soon followed suit. He served in the 3rd Marine Raider Battalion, and was in heavy fighting on the island of Bougainville during the Solomon Islands campaign. Wounded multiple times, he was discharged in August, 1944. He attempted to complete his education at Ballard High School, but left after two weeks.

== Career ==
Gilkey worked a succession of jobs, including sailor, ranch hand, and logger, while at the same time developing both an interest in art and a reputation as a barroom brawler. A private tour of the Seattle Art Museum offered by assistant director Ed Thomas had a profound effect on him, leaving him particularly moved by the works of Guy Anderson, Morris Graves, and Mark Tobey. Years later, he wrote:

Bay Fields, Skagit Flats, Richard Gilkey, 1978

“The discovery of works by Anderson, Graves and Tobey in the Seattle Art Museum was a revelation and a turning point in my life. Here were paintings that addressed my concerns from very different points of view. Guy Anderson had painted the fallen parachutist, the wounded and damaged warrior, figures in rocks, in the sea and on the beach. Graves used personal symbols to indicate his feeling of the senselessness of war: birds, moons, gloves and urns. Tobey enmeshed figures, cities and worlds in threaded light and pointed to the unity of energy in all forms and deplored the egocentrism of warring nations. After meeting these artists, I gained from their encouragement, guidance and friendship".

With their encouragement, he opened a studio in Seattle's Skid Road area. In 1948 a $1,000 inheritance from his grandmother allowed him to spend four months touring the great museums of Europe; he was especially impressed by the works of Rembrandt, Francisco Goya, and Vincent van Gogh. Returning to Seattle, he spent the next few years developing his painting style while living in a small apartment with fellow painter Leo Kenney. He also became a fixture at the Blue Moon Tavern, the locus of Seattle's 'Beat' counterculture, near the University of Washington. In 1954 Gilkey, William Ivey, Ward Corley, and Jack Stangle were featured in a four-man show at the Seattle Art Museum.

In 1958 a Guggenheim Fellowship allowed him to spend a year traveling and studying in Europe. He spent several months in Ireland and Italy, and had a memorable, spontaneous encounter with Pablo Picasso and his wife, Jacqueline Roque.

On his return, Gilkey's art began to reach maturity. Unmoved by Abstract Expressionism and the emerging Pop Art of the 1960s, he began making regular painting trips to the Skagit Valley, primarily working outdoors. In 1975 he purchased and remodeled a studio house in the Skagit Flats. His origins in the area and the beauty of the region were reflected in his paintings. Over the course of his career, Gilkey developed a distinctive style that stimulated his intellectual curiosity. He sought answers about the nature of the Universe that were scientific rather than philosophical, and material rather than metaphysical. Later in his career, Gilkey turned to painting abstractions, using black and white to represent the ancient Chinese philosophy of yin and yang.

Although he now avoided barroom brawling, Gilkey remained a temperamental figure, well known for his disputes with gallery owners, curators, and critics, and for his dislike of the 'gallery system'. The first independent show of Gilkey's work, mounted by his longtime friend Janet Huston, took place in March 1977, at a space in downtown Seattle. After Seattle Post-Intelligencer art critic Richard Campbell expressed disapproval of his use of a private agent, an outraged Gilkey appeared at the newspaper's office, gave Campbell a tongue lashing, and overturned his desk before stalking out.

In 1982, Gilkey's work was included in a show of Pacific Northwest artists at Osaka's National Museum of Art, along with art by George Tsutakawa, Paul Horiuchi, Guy Anderson, Kenneth Callahan, Morris Graves, Leo Kenney, Philip McCracken, Mark Tobey, and other artists chosen for their interest in the Asian tradition. Wrote Gilkey:

"The Japanese nature spirit pervades many facets of life and becomes a celebration of nature, transformed through art. Artists have the potential to advance a heightened perception of reality and by this process enhance both art and living, which are one."

Night Journey, Richard Gilkey, 1990

An automobile accident while on vacation in New Mexico in December 1984 left Gilkey with several crushed vertebrae. He was unable to paint for three years. Two years after that, his new works, representing his explorations of the nature of consciousness, were shown at Janet Huston's newly opened gallery in the Skagit Valley, and were greeted with critical acclaim, good sales, and an award from the Governor of the State of Washington.

On a day in early November that he described as "the best and the worst day of my life," Gilkey, 64, was named grand prize winner of the Osaka Triennale 1990 Exhibition, a juried competition with 30,000 entries from around the world. At 4 a.m. the same day, a levee on the Skagit River broke, flooding his Fir Island studio. Gilkey had to row a skiff out to his house to pick up a coat and the acceptance speech he'd written to fax to Osaka.

== Death ==
In September 1997, Gilkey, who was already having heart trouble, was diagnosed with lung cancer. Shortly after the diagnosis, he drove to Jackson Hole, Wyoming. Some time before noon on Friday, October 3, 1997, he parked his pickup truck on the side of a dirt road near the summit of 9,600-foot Togwotee Pass in the Grand Tetons, and fatally shot himself. He was 71 years old. His body was found later that day by a forest ranger.

He left behind a note quoting the Meditations of Marcus Aurelius: "This is the chief thing: Be not perturbed, for all things are according to the nature of the Universal, and in a little time you will be no one and nowhere."

Gilkey's paintings are included in many museum collections of the Pacific Northwest, including the Seattle Art Museum. Gilkey also has work in many private and public collections, including the King County Arts Commission, The Seattle Times, and Swedish Hospital in Seattle. A large three-panel mural – each panel measuring 6 feet by 20 feet – hangs on the fourth floor of the Washington State Convention Center, also in Seattle.
