= James W. Washington Jr. =

American painter

James W. Washington Jr. (November 10, 1908 – June 7, 2000) was an American painter and sculptor prominent in the Seattle art community.

== Life ==
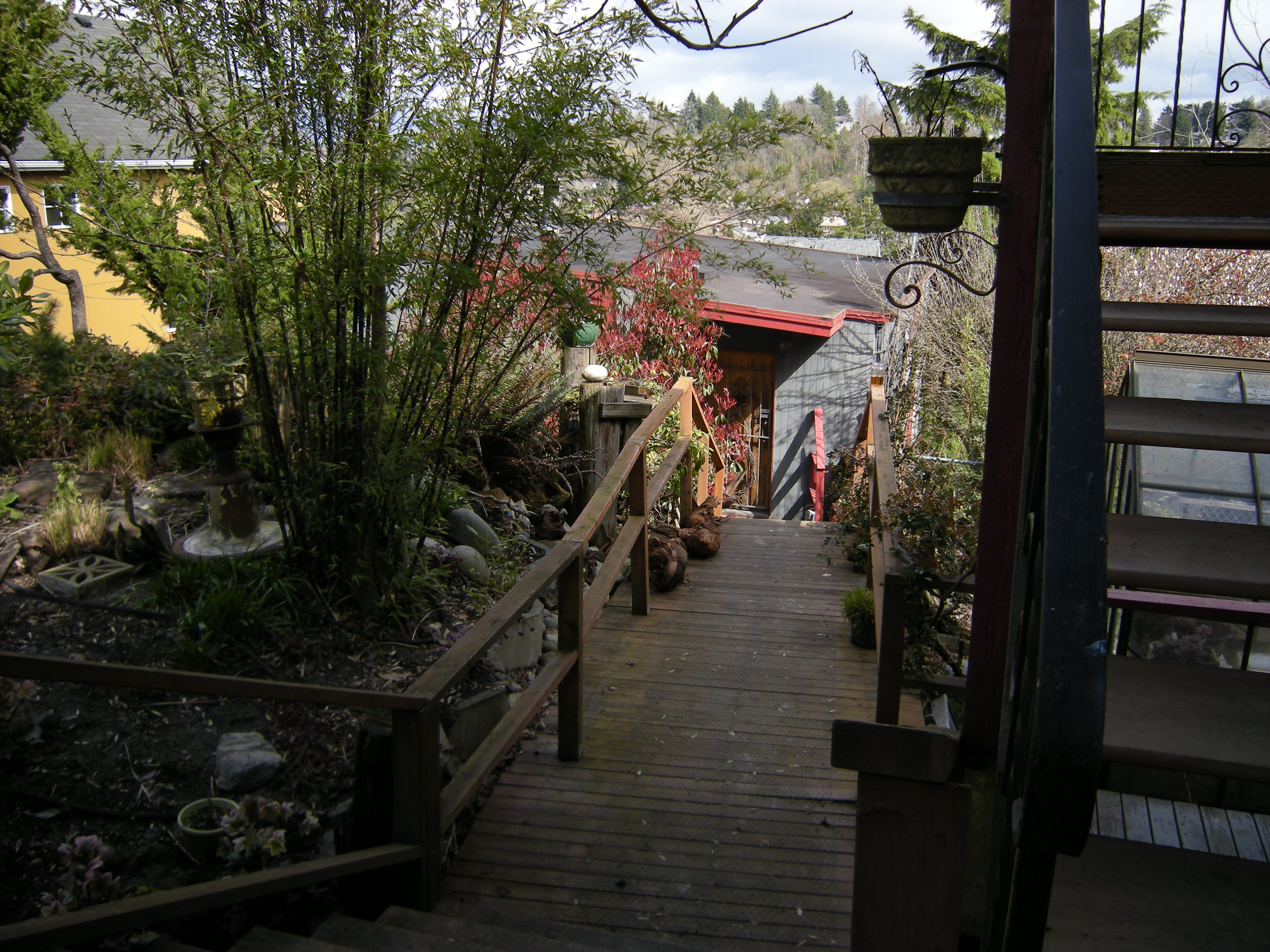
Garden and studio at Washington's Seattle home

Washington was born and raised in Gloster, Mississippi, a rural mill town in the Jim Crow South. He was one of six children of Baptist minister James Washington and his wife Lizzie. While he was still a child, his father fled due to threats of violence, and they never met again. He began to draw at the age of 12, and apprenticed at the age of 14 to become a shoemaker, and worked a series of odd jobs (including working with a banana messenger, which gave him the opportunity to travel regularly to bigger towns). By the time he was 17, he had obtained his first Civil Service job; he worked for the federal government intermittently until his late 50s.

In 1938 he became involved with the Federal Works Progress Administration as an assistant art instructor at the Baptist Academy in Vicksburg, Mississippi. Excluded in the South from shows featuring white artists, he created a WPA-sponsored exhibition of Black artists, the first such in Mississippi.

In 1941 Washington moved to Little Rock, Arkansas, where his mother had already taken up residence. He worked there repairing shoes at Camp Robinson. This Civil Service job soon took him to the Pacific Northwest, where he and his wife Janie Rogella Washington, née Miller, arrived in 1944. It was their home for the rest of their lives. Washington did electrical wiring for warships at the Bremerton, Washington Naval Base before transferring to Fort Lawton in Seattle, where he set up and operated a shoe shop.

He quickly became part of Seattle's then-small art community. He showed at the Frederick and Nelson Department Store Gallery with Leo Kenney, studied under Mark Tobey (who appears mostly to have encouraged him rather than taught him anything specific), and, from 1948 to 1961, curated a series of art shows at Seattle's Mount Zion Baptist Church. Among the artists who showed there was painter Kenneth Callahan, then a curator at the Seattle Art Museum. From the time of his study with Tobey, Washington's work took on characteristics of the Northwest School, sharing characteristics with Tobey's work and that of Morris Graves.

Other artists Washington met during this period were Dudley Pratt, Fay Chong, Andrew Chinn, Kenjiro Nomura, John Matsudaira, and George Tsutakawa. He also took University of Washington extension classes with painter Yvonne Twining Humber and printmaker Glen Alps.

Washington and his wife lived in Seattle's Central District, near the Madison Valley; he maintained a studio in his home. From 1950 he was a member of Artists Equity Seattle; he served as its secretary (1950–1960) and later president (1960–1962).

Washington traveled to Mexico in 1951, where he met muralists Diego Rivera and David Alfaro Siqueiros and where he encountered the soft volcanic stone that would soon drive his work in the direction of sculpture; what little sculpture he had done was in wood. His first stone sculpture, Young Boy of Athens was done with a stone he picked up at Teotihuacán on the path between the Pyramid of the Sun and the Pyramid of the Moon.

== Works ==
Washington was both a painter and a sculptor. Some of his paintings also incorporate collage. Many of his paintings depict exteriors or interiors of buildings that figured in his life, or views encountered in his travels. Others directly address the topic of racism, such as The Making of the UN Charter (1945), which incorporates collaged newspaper clippings and images of body parts, and which "express[es] the concept that Blacks died for the idea of freedom in World War II, but were denied a place in their own country as stated in human rights declarations at the United Nations." Similarly, his 1946 sculpture The Chaotic Half shows a black hand reaching for a ballot box, juxtaposed with a hooded Klansman, a crucifix, and a noose.

Washington often worked on African and African-American subjects. For example, he executed a sandstone sculpture of Jomo Kenyatta in 1962, and in 1969 was commissioned to execute six granite sculptures of famous African Americans for a "Rotunda of Achievement" at Leon Sullivan's Progress Plaza in North Philadelphia. His work also includes many references to Freemasonry and to biblical topics. He was a 33rd-degree Mason of the Rite Consistory, a member of Hercules Lodge no. 17.

Washington explicitly considered his art to be a spiritual undertaking. "To me," he said to an interviewer on one occasion, "art is a holy land". He said of sculpting an animal, "I wait until intuition moves me, and then… I get to the point where I am the animal… I release the spiritual force into the inanimate material and animate it." When this happens, I feel like I'm working with flesh rather than just stone" Among his overtly religious works are a series of paintings from 1952, The Passover (a version of the Last Supper), a Nativity Scene, and an encaustic of Christ in the Garden of Gethsemane. The last of these, which Deloris Tarzan Ament describes as "the strongest work of that series", shows "Christ at prayer amid a hail of scratched white lines and a background of dark billowing trees." One of his sculptures from the mid-1950s is entitled Head of Job.

Once Washington established himself as a sculptor, his preferred sculptural material was granite. Scholars have compared his early sculptural work to prehistoric Mediterranean pieces, but its simplicity and power also fit within the tradition of reductive modern sculpture.

== House and studio ==
Since 1992, Washington's house and studio at 1816 26th Avenue have had official status as a Seattle city landmark.
