= Neil Meitzler =

American painter

Neil Meitzler (1930–2009) was an American painter, well known in the Pacific Northwest for his landscapes and scenes of nature, rendered in a distinctive, modern style. He is often associated with the 'Northwest School' art movement.

== Life and career ==
Meitzler was born Herbert Neil Claussen in Pueblo, Colorado, on September 14, 1930. Seeking work in the midst of the Great Depression, his family moved to Oregon, where Neil began using his stepfather's last name, after his father died and his mother remarried. When he was twelve his family moved again, to Orting, Washington (near Tacoma), and started a successful greenhouse flower-growing business. His mother and stepfather were devout Seventh-day Adventists.

Meitzler had been interested in art from early youth, and wanted to be either a professional artist or a minister. After leaving high school he moved to Seattle, and eventually began working as a draftsman at Boeing.

Railroad Tunnel on South Fork of the Stillaguamish River, Neil Meitzler, 1959.

While at Boeing Meitzler won first prize in an employee art show, which led to exhibitions at small galleries, some sales, and critical notice. While working as a set painter he met Kenneth Callahan, who became his mentor and teacher; he also befriended Morris Graves, Mark Tobey, and other artists of the 'Northwest School'. Meitzler's early work was firmly rooted in traditional landscape painting, eventually showing the influence of mid-century Modern art, but it wasn't until his introduction to the "Northwest mystics" and Asian art that his work reached full flower. His landscapes, often featuring rocks and waterfalls, took on a soft, otherworldly glow, while blurring the line between representational and abstract art.

Beginning in 1957, Meitzler worked as an exhibition designer at the Seattle Art Museum. His work was at its most popular in the Northwest from the late 1950s through the mid-70s, in which period he received several awards, appeared in two solo shows at the Zoë Dusanne Gallery and one at SAM, was included in several regional and national group exhibitions, and generally enjoyed strong sales at galleries in the Northwest.

In 1977 he left the Northwest to work for the Seventh-day Adventist church's publishing arm on the East Coast; he continued painting, did commercial work, and taught art classes, but was mainly focused on family and religion in this period.

Throughout his life Meitzler was torn by conflict between his homosexuality and his religious faith. A short marriage in the early 1950s produced a son, but ended acrimoniously. A happier marriage, to Marcia Dawson, who had two young daughters, lasted from 1972 to 1987. In his late fifties, divorced and with children grown, he again became interested in fine art, his later work at times reflecting a growing acceptance of both his religious and sexual orientation.

In 1989 Meitzler returned to Washington, settling in Walla Walla, where he worked for a publishing company and lived with Ikune Sawada, a painter and master landscaper. The two built a comfortably eccentric home/studio with an elaborate Japanese garden in back, and spent much time in Japan. Meitzler continued to paint, exploring new stylistic directions and occasionally exhibiting.

He died on Feb. 21st, 2009, after a struggle with pancreatic cancer.

A major, in-depth retrospective of Meitzler's career was presented at Whitman College's Sheehan Gallery, in Walla Walla, in 2010.

== Legacy ==
Meitzler received many awards throughout his life, including a National Council of the Arts Artists Grant in 1957. His work is found in significant private, corporate, and museum collections across the United States, including the Seattle Art Museum, the Henry Art Gallery, the Memphis Academy of Art, the Washington County Museum of Art in Maryland, Museum of Northwest Art in Laconner WA, Whatcom Museum, Bellingham, the Jundt Art Museum at Gonzaga University, and in the collection of the Imperial Family of Japan.
