= Helmi Juvonen =

American artist

Mark Tobey's Eskimo Mask, by Helmi Juvonen, linocut with added color, 1954.

Helmi Dagmar Juvonen (January 17, 1903 – October 17, 1985) was an American artist active in Seattle, Washington. Although she worked in a wide variety of media, she is best known for her prints, paintings, and drawings. She is associated with the artists of the Northwest School.

== Early life ==
Helmi Dagmar Juvonen was born in Butte, Montana on January 17, 1903, the second daughter of Finnish immigrants (Helmi is Finnish for Pearl). When she was 15, her family moved to Seattle, Washington. She attended Queen Anne High School, and after graduating, worked various art and design-related jobs while studying illustration, portraiture, and life drawing with private teachers. In 1929 she received a scholarship to Cornish College of the Arts, where she studied illustration with Walter Reese, puppetry with Richard Odlin, and lithography with Emilio Amero.

== Career ==
After finishing her studies at Cornish, Juvonen struggled to make a living in the midst of the Great Depression. She did portraits for well-to-do friends, designed greeting cards, made rag dolls and puppets, illustrated newspaper articles, did department store window displays, and made ceramic keepsakes for gift shops, while pursuing creative art, and occasionally selling or receiving a prize for an original piece.

In 1930 she was first diagnosed with manic depression, and spent three years in Northern State Hospital in Sedro-Woolley, Washington.

An avid reader, Juvonen's favorite subjects were the mythologies and spiritual practices of people around the world. While doing drawings of the Seattle Potlatch festival for a newspaper in 1934, Helmi met Chief Shelton of the Lummi Tribe, and soon after, Chief Colowash of the Yakima tribe, Charlie Swan of the Makah, and White Eagle of the Chippewa. This was the beginning of a lifelong interest in native art and culture. She was eventually invited to attend special ceremonies, some of which were rarely witnessed by outsiders. These experiences had a profound influence on her artwork.

Actively engaged with the burgeoning Seattle art community, Juvonen made and fostered friendships with a number of artists and collectors, including Seattle Art Museum founder Richard Fuller, sculptor Dudley Pratt, and painter Mark Tobey, with whom she developed an obsession that became a frequent subject of her art.

Like many artists during the Great Depression, Juvonen participated in Federal Art Project programs. Hired by the FAP's Washington State Director Bruce Inverarity, in the spring of 1938 she made sketches of Hooverville, the large unemployed encampment south of downtown Seattle; in 1940, she and other women artists of the FAP created hooked rugs for ski lodges in floral and Native American designs. She also helped create dioramas of tribal life for the University of Washington Museum (later known as the Burke Museum of Natural History and Culture).

During the Second World War Juvonen worked for the Boeing company, doing technical drawings. Around this time she also spent several months in Seattle's Harborview hospital to treat her depression.

When she could, she continued to attend and sketch regional Indian ceremonies, often spending weeks at a time on the reservations. She recorded the tribal dances of the Lummi-Swinomish on the La Conner Reservation during the winter of 1945, and in 1946 she spent a week with the Yakima sketching their ceremonies. In 1947 she stayed on Vancouver Island for several months and was allowed to attend the initiation ceremony of a secret society. She spent a week at Neah Bay in August 1951, sketching Makah Indian dances, costumes, and artifacts, and attended ceremonial dances at a gathering of many different tribes at La Conner in 1953. She also did hundreds of drawings of Native American artifacts in the Washington State History Museum.

By the early 1950s Juvonen was a well-known artist in the Pacific Northwest. Works of hers had been displayed in local galleries, and several were in the collection of the Seattle Art Museum; however, she still had very little money. Her small house overlooking West Seattle's Beach Drive, which she had purchased in 1937, became increasingly dilapidated. Although she remained friends with Mark Tobey and his partner Pehr Hallsten, her obsession with Tobey at times contributed to serious questioning of her health, and she was institutionalized for several months in 1952 and 53. With her house rendered uninhabitable by vandals in her absence, Juvonen spent the next couple of years living among artist friends in Seattle's bustling University District, where she worked in a children's nursery and sold original prints from the front of a frame shop. During this time Tobey occasionally let her use his studio, but her obsession with him became so troublesome that he eventually considered taking legal action against her.

In 1956 Juvonen, who was supporting herself by selling prints from a stall in the Pike Place Market, moved into a small house in Edmonds, Washington. The shack-like house was soon overrun with cats and chickens, and neighbors complained frequently. In 1959, she was committed to Northern State Hospital in Sedro-Woolley, Washington. After one year of confinement there, she was transferred to Oakhurst Infirmary (later known as Oakhurst Convalescent Center) in Elma, Washington, where she spent the rest of her life. In spite of her surroundings, Juvonen tirelessly continued to produce art, using whatever materials she was able to secure.

== Artistic practice ==
Juvonen's largest works from the late 1940s through the 1960s are organized laterally and characterized by shallow indeterminate space and "all-overness". She valued and practiced conventional techniques of three-dimensional illusionism through the 1950s; she also developed a range of strategies much closer to graffiti and cartoons. A light or white delineation on a darker ground, which frequently appears in her works, suggests chalk on a blackboard, and vernacular references in her work are commonly associated with the "white writing" identified with Mark Tobey and Morris Graves. Juvonen introduces into her work words and phrases, a variety of human figures and faces, architectural elements, and religious and eclectic symbols from diverse cultures.

== Later years ==
In her twenty-five years at Oakhurst, Juvonen often expressed hope of being released, but wrote torrents of letters to friends and strangers which appeared to indicate a deteriorating mental state. Her obsession with Mark Tobey continued. She referred to him as "Papa Moth" and fantasized that he was going to rescue her from the infirmary, marry her, and have children with her, although Tobey was gay and she was past child-bearing age.

Fellow artists and friends such as Wesley Wehr, Morris Graves, Neil Meitzler, Tom Kaasa, and Brent Goeres preserved and stored her artwork, visited and wrote her in Elma, took her on day trips, and organized occasional small gallery exhibits. Authorities at Oakhurst allowed her to keep a large number of cats.

During the final years of her life there was a surge of interest in Juvonen's work. In 1975, curators Betty Bowen and Anne Gould Hauberg organized an exhibition at the Pacific Northwest Arts Center Gallery, in Seattle's Pioneer Square. The success of this show led to Wesley Wehr guest-curating an exhibition of her work at the Frye Art Museum in November 1976. This was followed by a Helmi show at the Burke Museum in Seattle in 1982, and, in 1984, shows at the Nordic Heritage Museum in Seattle, and at the Evergreen State College Gallery and the Washington State Capital Museum, both in Olympia. She was the subject of a retrospective exhibition at the Whatcom Museum of History and Art, in Bellingham, in 1985.

== Death and legacy ==
Helmi Juvonen died on October 17, 1985, after going into a diabetic coma. She is buried next to her mother and her sister Irene in Forest Lawn Memorial Park in Glendale, California.

In 2001, Urich Fritzsche, who had befriended Juvonen in 1975, released a book alleging serious mistreatment of the artist by both the state legal system and the art community. He noted that Juvonen's first two incarcerations were at the request of her mother, who had long objected to her non-traditional choice of career and lifestyle, and that at one point the state's evaluation of her mental health hadn't been updated in twenty-one years. Fritzsche also claimed that Seattle Art Museum director Fuller, Wehr, and others had taken advantage of her ward-of-the-state status to procure works of hers without permission or payment.

Since her death, public interest in Juvonen has continued to grow, particularly in the Pacific Northwest. The Frye presented another show of her work in 2012, and the Museum of Northwest Art in La Conner, Washington, held a major exhibition in 1991.
