= Jay Steensma =

American painter

Jay Steensma, artist (1941–1994) photo (detail): Alice Wheeler

Jay Steensma (1941–1994), also known as J. Steensma, was an American artist, primarily a painter, sometimes described by reviewers as a later-day exponent of the Northwest School of artists. He was known for his extremely prolific output, and, at times, unusual media (such as latex house paint on brown paper shopping bags). Chalices, snakes, houses, clouds, birds, and fish were frequent subjects in his work. He was one of the more successful artists in the Pacific Northwest in the 1980s and 90s, but had longstanding health problems, and died in Seattle at age 52.

== Life and career ==
John Jay Steensma (Frisian; trans., 'stonemason') was born December 8, 1941, in Moscow, Idaho, the eldest son of John and Oliva Steensma, and was raised in nearby Belmont, Washington. He moved to Seattle in 1959 to attend the University of Washington School of Art, where influential teachers included Walter F. Isaacs, Spencer Moseley, Bob Jones, and Wendell Brazeau. While there he won a prize in the Northwest Printmakers Annual at the Henry Art Gallery.

After receiving his Bachelor of Fine Arts degree in 1962 he studied with Morris Graves, and befriended Mark Tobey, Guy Anderson, and other artists of the original Northwest School. He briefly worked at the Museum of Modern Art in New York City, then in 1965 returned to Seattle, where he taught at the Cornish College of the Arts.

Grey Cabin, oil on canvas, Jay Steensma, 1990

From the early 1960s Steensma's work was shown in Seattle galleries such as the Kinorn and Francine Seders, and in 1965 he won First Prize in painting at the Pacific Northwest Arts and Crafts Fair in Bellevue, Washington; however, he suffered from manic-depressive illness, and by the mid-70s his erratic behavior had largely alienated him from the arts community. He was at times institutionalized, and didn't have another exhibition until 1985, at Seattle's Jackson Street Gallery.

After this comeback, Steensma's art received considerable acclaim, and was included in exhibitions at the Seattle Art Museum, the Whatcom Museum of History and Art, the Cheney Cowles Museum, at Mia Gallery in Seattle and galleries in Chicago, San Diego, and Portland, Oregon.

Wrote arts journalist Regina Hackett:

His paintings [are] muted in color. Beneath their delicacy is an awkward vitality. Instead of moments of enlightenment, however, he specialized in moments of acute and resounding alienation. He was an artist brave enough to persist in spite of a daunting disability. Along with being immensely afflicted, he was immensely gifted. With a few strokes, he could render a landscape that reverberates with visual meaning, a mood stated with the barest of means.

Since the 1970s Steensma lived in Seattle's Greenlake neighborhood with close friend and fellow artist Ree Brown. He was friends with Wes Wehr, who often went with Jay for drawing sessions at area coffeehouses. Wehr collected works by Steensma that he later donated to a number of museums around the northwest. He died in Seattle on October 7, 1994, at the age of 52.
