= Barbara Straker James =

American artist

Barbara Straker James (1918-2007) was an American artist. She was the curator of the Museum of Northwest Art from 1991 to 2002.

Born Barbara Straker in Massachusetts in 1918, she graduated from the Rhode Island School of Design in 1942. In 1944 she left the East Coast with her husband and fellow RISD Art student Clayton James and relocated to La Conner, Washington. She and her husband worked with fellow "Northwest School" artists Guy Anderson, Morris Graves, and Kenneth Callahan. Barbara Straker James was part of a larger group of Skagit Valley artists who have been recognized in recent years.
