= Leo Kenney =

American painter (1925–2001)

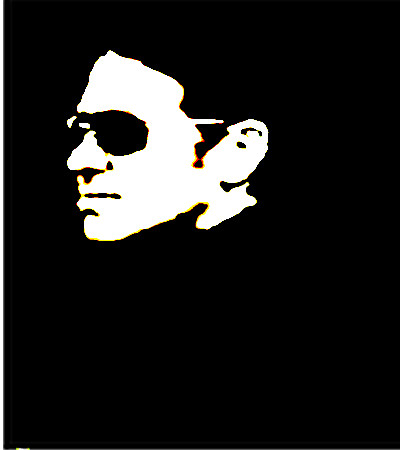
Leo Kenney

Leo Kenney (1925–2001) was an American abstract painter, described by critics as a leading figure in the second generation of the 'Northwest School' of artists.

== Early life ==
Kenney was born in Spokane, Washington on March 5, 1925, and moved to Seattle with his family at age six. He was interested in art from a young age, copying pictures from newspapers and art magazines. He had an early love of surrealism, and did very well in art classes. Although an intensely energetic kid, he had health problems related to his small stature. At one point in his teenage years he suffered a case of mumps so serious that he had to spend several weeks in bed, his weight dropping to 70 pounds.

Figures in Landscape, 1945, Leo Kenney

He attended Broadway High School, on Seattle's Capitol Hill. An art teacher, Jule Kullberg, sent him to see the works of Mark Tobey and Morris Graves at the Seattle Art Museum. "I was never so knocked out as when I first saw Graves' Morning Star and In the Night," Kenney recalled in a 1999 interview. "It was an epiphany to come upon his work - the originality of it."

Kenney was dumbfounded when, following the attack on Pearl Harbor and the beginning of American involvement in World War II, his Japanese friends from Broadway High were removed from school for shipment to internment camps. "It was the awakening of my social consciousness," he later recalled.

In 1942 Kenney's older brother Jack was drafted into the U.S. Army; shortly after that, his father died. An average student at best, he dropped out of high school on his 18th birthday. He was promptly called up by the draft, but, being underweight, was rejected. He went to work at the Douglas Aircraft assembly plant in Long Beach, California.

Kenney returned to Seattle in 1944. After his mother remarried and moved to Long Beach, he moved in with the family of a friend, Jack Griffin. He routinely painted through the night in the basement room he shared with Griffin, who was so impressed with Kenney's work that he took some of his paintings to the Frederick & Nelson's department store in downtown Seattle, which had a small art gallery. Kenney's first exhibition, along with sculptor James W. Washington, Jr., took place there in 1944. The gallery manager then brought Kenney's work to the attention of Dr. Richard Fuller, the director of the Seattle Art Museum, which bought its first Kenney painting, The Inception of Magic, in 1945. The artist was just 20 years old.

== Career ==
Amaranth, 1983, Leo Kenney

At a young age Kenney had read Salvador Dalí's autobiography and the works of poet André Breton, and had become fascinated with surrealism. The influence is plain in his dark, figurative works of the 1940s and '50s. Taking Breton's proclamation that "only the marvelous is beautiful" to heart, he painted "automatically", without conscious planning. Except for a few portraits done for friends, he never tried to reproduce reality in his paintings, always searching instead for deeper meaning.

"He never saw the world as others see it," said a longtime friend and patron, Merch Pease. "His work is highly personal. It's pure invention."

In the late 1940s Kenney lived in a small apartment near the University of Washington with the brilliant, combative, hard-drinking painter Richard Gilkey. The two became fixtures at the Blue Moon Tavern, the locus of Seattle's nascent 'Beat' culture. In 1948 two of Kenney's paintings were accepted by the Seattle Art Museum for its Annual Exhibition of the Artists of the Pacific Northwest (the 'Northwest Annuals'); one of them, Third Offering, won a prize and cash award. The following year SAM presented a solo exhibition of Kenney's work. At age 24 he most likely was (and still is) the youngest artist to have a solo show at the museum. As the Pacific Northwest's most popular young painter he soon found himself overwhelmed with commissioned work, and fled to California, where he would stay for the next several years.

After briefly returning to Douglas Aircraft, he stumbled onto a job, in 1952, as a display artist at Gump's, a major seller of Asian art in San Francisco. He spent the next six years there, becoming the company's director of display, then moved to a different art dealership, W. & J. Sloane. He painted only sporadically during this time, but learned a great deal about Asian art. His fascination with an Eastern symbol, the mandala, led to a shift in his work away from the figure and into a pure abstraction of glowing colors and simple, geometric forms, detailed with obsessive intricacy. In 1960 he quit his job in order to refocus on painting.

Night Picture, 1960, Leo Kenney

Kenney's 1962 experiments with mescaline had a pronounced effect on his art. The writer Deloris Tarzan Ament would later say:

Figures and representational images disappeared. In their place appeared a long series of paintings that were variations on an inner circle radiating misty echoes like the reverberations of a gong. They are elemental forms, drenched with archetypal resonance; symbols of source as well as pure studies of light and form.

As the 1960s progressed the world seemed to be catching up to Kenney's proto-psychedelic visions. He moved back to Seattle in 1964, and subsequent gallery shows were met with strong sales and critical acclaim. In 1967 the American Academy of Arts and Letters recognized him with a display of his work at the Academy and an award of $2,500. His paintings were included in the West Coast Now traveling exhibition. Mark Tobey and Morris Graves' agent in New York, Marian Willard, arranged a New York exhibition for Kenney at the Willard Gallery in 1968. The show was such a success that Willard immediately wanted to schedule an encore. The Seattle Art Museum, initially somewhat skeptical of Kenney's newer work, slated a solo exhibition for 1973, in tandem with an exhibition at Seattle's Foster/White Gallery.

Despite his success, Kenney was growing tired of the symmetric shapes of his most popular work, and began loosening up his composition and breaking his shapes into pieces. As he explored these new directions he became increasingly uncomfortable with the pressure to churn out new paintings. His meticulous attention to detail had always necessitated a slow working pace, and now, in his late forties, burdened by ill health and a drinking problem, he simply couldn't produce enough work to keep up with demand. By the late 1970s his celebrity began to recede. He painted sporadically and sold work out of his studio to help pay his expenses, but was never able to complete enough paintings for another gallery exhibition.

Centralia I, 1968, Leo Kenney

== Later years ==
Kenney remained a master colorist and technician among Northwest painters. However, injuries and alcohol greatly reduced his artistic output. His old friend and patron Merch Pease helped him reorder his health and his finances somewhat, and in 1996 the Port Angeles Fine Art Center mounted Leo Kenney: Geometrics, a showing of his work since the 1973 Seattle Art Museum show. In 2000 the Museum of Northwest Art in La Conner, Washington presented Celebrating the Mysteries, a comprehensive overview of Kenney's 50-year career curated by Barbara Straker James. Though ailing, Kenney happily gabbed with guests and old friends for several hours at the exhibition's opening celebration.

Suffering from cancer and emphysema, Kenney died on February 26, 2001, in Seattle.

In 2014, several of his works were included in Modernism in the Pacific Northwest: the Mythic and the Mystical, a major exhibition at the Seattle Art Museum.
