= John Franklin Koenig =

American painter

- Koenig, c. 1980s
- Born: October 24, 1924; Seattle, United States
- Died: January 22, 2008 (aged 83); Seattle, United States

John-Franklin Koenig (1924 — 2008) was an American artist who, though born and raised in Seattle, Washington, and sometimes associated with the 'Northwest School' of artists, spent most of his career in France. He was primarily a painter and collagist, working in a modern, non-representational style. His work appeared in hundreds of exhibitions around the world. He died in Seattle in 2008.

== Early life, education, World War II service ==
Koenig was born Oct. 24th, 1924, in Seattle, to parents of Swiss-German and French Huguenot extraction. He attended Lincoln High School. Interested in art from a young age, he was particularly taken with Asian art he saw at the Seattle Art Museum.

In 1943, while studying at the University of Washington, he was drafted by the U.S. Army and trained as a tank crewman. Landing at Cherbourg with the 11th Armored Division in 1944, he immediately fell in love with France and French culture. A few weeks later he received shrapnel wounds to the head and back in the Battle of the Bulge. While awaiting transfer back to the U.S. after the war's end, he took art classes at a G.I. University in Biarritz. There he made his first paintings.

Koenig returned to the University of Washington, where he studied art, French, and French literature. Around this time he also became interested in the work of Northwest artists such as Mark Tobey and Morris Graves. In 1948 he acquired a degree in Romance languages and moved to Paris to study at the Sorbonne on the G.I. Bill.

== In France ==
Ode a Prokofieff, John Franklin Koenig, 1953.

After finishing his studies Koenig remained in Paris, working at the bookstore of Jean-Robert Arnaud, who became his longstanding professional and personal partner. In 1950 the two opened the Galerie Arnaud (which lasted until 1976), and in 1955 began publication of the art review Ciamise, which was devoted entirely to non-figurative contemporary art

Koenig's earliest exhibitions were made up of collage work, and he would work in various media (including photography, ceramics, glass, printmaking, and textiles) throughout his career; by the mid-1950s, however, he had focused on painting, and was gaining a reputation in France as a proponent of abstract expressionism.

In 1958 the first major U.S. exhibition of his work was held at the Zoë Dusanne Gallery in Seattle. Traveling home to participate proved revelatory to Koenig: "I saw the West again. Here was all this space and light you couldn't see in Europe. This contact with space and light was a huge turning point in my art. It was like being reborn. I found my style."

His longtime interest in Asian art was deepened by his first visit to Japan, in 1960. Inspired by Japanese garden design, he developed a style he called Koen (Japanese: 'garden').

Acting as his own manager, Koenig traveled extensively, setting up exhibitions along the way. He showed throughout Europe as well as in North Africa, Iceland, and Haiti. He made several more trips to Japan, where he became particularly well-known.

A retrospective of his work was held at the Seattle Art Museum in 1970.

In 1980, feeling hobbled by a weak economy and high taxes in France, Koenig moved back to the U.S.

== In Seattle ==
Untitled, John Franklin Koenig, 1962.

Having bought a house in Seattle's Capitol Hill neighborhood, Koenig devoted himself to promoting the work of Northwest artists, who he felt were at that time badly underrepresented in Seattle's mainstream art institutions. He organized shows of Northwest art which were presented locally and as traveling exhibitions in France.

He became known as a colorful and controversial figure in Seattle's arts community. Accustomed to the French system of patronage, he was often in conflict with local gallery owners.

== Later years ==
In 1985 Koenig returned to Paris, where he maintained a small apartment. From then on he split his time between France and the U.S., while continuing to paint, travel, and exhibit around the world.

In 1991 he purchased an 18th-century farmhouse in Nancray-sur-Rimarde, 100 km south of Paris, which he converted into a country retreat and studio.

In poor health, Koenig returned to Seattle in 2006. On January 22, 2008, he died at a care facility in North Seattle. He was 83.

== Legacy ==
The process of painting is a search for one's identity; it is an integrated part of the daily task, humble and stubborn, necessary to give form and structure and presence to a sort of glowing figure a la Blake that the artist should be. Oh, make no mistake, the creator is too acquainted with failure, doubt, and nothingness to think that he might be a kind of pure form on the face of earth. He can be no angel, for an angel is the very symbol of perfection, and perfection implies a finite state. Nothing is ever finished for the creator.

— John-Franklin Koenig,

In 1986, Koenig received the Gold Medal of the City of Paris and was later made a Commander of the French Order of Arts and Letters. In 1989, the Paris Arts Center held a retrospective of his work. His paintings and collages have been shown in nearly 150 solo exhibitions around the world and are part of collections in a number of international museums, including the Musée d'Art Moderne de la Ville de Paris and the Musée National d'Art Moderne (Paris); the National Museum of Modern Art and the National Museum of Western Art (Tokyo); the Musée des Beaux-Arts and Musée d'Art Contemporain (Montreal); the Musée de l'État (Luxembourg); and the Seattle Art Museum. A major retrospective of Koenig's career opened at the Whatcom Museum in Bellingham, Washington, two months after his death.

In 1986, Koenig received the Gold Medal of the City of Paris and was later made a Commander of the French Order of Arts and Letters. In 1989, the Paris Arts Center held a retrospective of his work. His paintings and collages have been shown in nearly 150 solo exhibitions around the world and are part of collections in a number of international museums, including the Musée d'Art Moderne de la Ville de Paris and the Musée National d'Art Moderne (Paris); the National Museum of Modern Art and the National Museum of Western Art (Tokyo); the Musée des Beaux-Arts and Musée d'Art Contemporain (Montreal); the Musée de l'État (Luxembourg); and the Seattle Art Museum. A major retrospective of Koenig's career opened at the Whatcom Museum in Bellingham, Washington, two months after his death.
