= Northwest School (art) =

American art movement

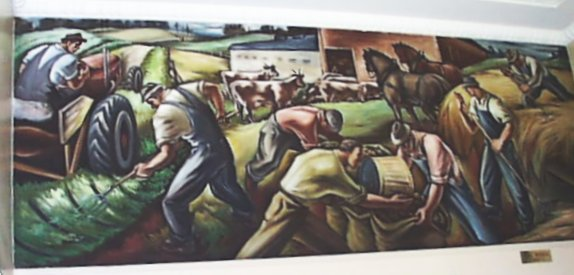
- Carl Morris Agriculture, c. 1941–42, mural, Eugene, Oregon post office
- Location: Pacific Northwest; Puget Sound; Skagit Valley; Seattle
- Major figures: Guy Anderson; Kenneth Callahan; Morris Graves; Mark Tobey
- Influences: Asian aesthetics; Mysticism

The Northwest School was an American art movement established in the Seattle area. It flourished in the 1930s–40s.

== The Big Four ==
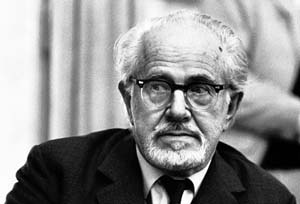
Mark Tobey

The movement's early participants, and its defining artists, have become known as "the big four": Guy Anderson, Kenneth Callahan, Morris Graves and Mark Tobey. Their work became recognized nationally from LIFE magazine's 1953 article Mystic Painters of the Northwest, which featured biographies and works of the four artists. The article was the first such broad recognition of artists from this corner of the world beyond traditional Northwest Native American art forms, which had been long recognized as "northwest art."

These artists combined natural elements of the Puget Sound area with traditional Asian aesthetics to create a novel and distinct regional style, particularly in painting and sculpture, with some drawing, printmaking and photography. Tobey, Callahan, Graves and Anderson were all immersed in and greatly influenced by the atmosphere of the Pacific Northwest environment.

Seattle was a common locale which they all shared at points in their lives, and some of them were closely associated for a time with the Seattle Art Museum in Volunteer Park. The town of Edmonds also figures heavily in the NW School, as Guy Anderson's hometown and studio were in Edmonds, and Morris Graves's home and studio were in nearby Woodway. Over time, the influence of the natural setting of Western Washington, especially the flat lands, meandering river channels, and wide open skies of the Skagit Valley, became a unifying aspect of their art. The media most commonly used by the painters in this group of artists were tempera, oil and gouache on canvas. They also used these media on paper and wood. Morris Graves worked for periods in three dimensional forms, using steel and glass and stone, among other materials. Guy Anderson, whose main medium was oil painting, also made works from bronze and had "collages" around his home of found objects from beach walks and deteriorating metal which he saw beauty in. These forms influenced his painting.

== Style ==
Ambrose Patterson – Self-portrait ("La Fenêtre de l'atelier")

The style of the Northwest School is characterized by the use of symbols of the nature of Western Washington, as well as the diffuse lighting characteristic of the Skagit Valley area. The lighting and choice of earthy tonal ranges in the color is one of the most important qualities of Northwest art. Tobey, whose artwork did not include as much natural Northwest subject matter, is identified as Northwest style because of the soft pastel colors which he used, and the dark mist chroma of lighting, with few stark shadows.

The Northwest artists were labeled as mystics, although some forcefully denied this label. They denied being a "school" of art, but they did know one another. Callahan hosted salons in which the others participated. Anderson and Graves travelled together and painted in the North Cascades and elsewhere.

Dealers such as Zoe Dusanne, Gordon Woodside and John Braseth of the Woodside/Braseth Gallery, as well as museum professionals grouped the four artists together, as did journalists. Their styles showed unifying themes that suggested something unique and previously unseen from this geographic area. A review of the titles of some of the paintings leads to spiritual interpretations of northwest life.

In addition to the local natural setting and the Asian influence, the Northwest School also shows some influence from surrealism, cubism and abstract expressionism. The cubist influence is shown to some extent in Kenneth Callahan's Prism and the Dark Globe (1946) and Tobey's Western Town (1944). All these artists both loved the pacific northwest and were keenly aware of the larger world of which it was part. Their work was recognized for being both essentially northwest and far from provincial.

== Influence ==
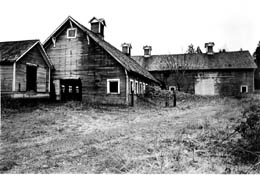
Elliot Dairy Farm, photograph by Mary Randlett (1920)

Many younger artists around the Pacific Northwest found resonance in how qualities of the region seemed so strongly evident while something universal also glowed in these earlier artists' works. Influences and inspirations traceable to these earlier painters can be seen in work by many contemporary artists. One notable example would be Jay Steensma, who died in 1997. He left numerous moody, misty, "northwesty" paintings-some of them titled with admiring reference to Anderson, Tobey, Graves, and Helmi Juvonen. While Tobey influenced the Japanese artist, Kenjiro Nomura, the work of Nomura and Kamekichi Tokita was said to "foreshadow characteristics of the Northwest School".

The works of artists such as photographer Mary Randlett and sculptor Tony Angell relate strongly to the Northwest School. Angell's sculpture often incorporates birds, as did Washington's, Gilkey's and McCracken's work. The flowing and silhouette style of Angell's work closely ties it to McCracken's sculpture. Randlett took black and white photographs of northwest landscapes that often have wonderfully painterly qualities.

The Museum of Northwest Art in La Conner, Washington is dedicated to the works of the original artists of the Northwest School and their successors.

== Notable people ==
Big Four

- Guy Anderson (1906–1998)
- Kenneth Callahan (1905–1986)
- Morris Graves (1910–2001)
- Mark Tobey (1890–1976)

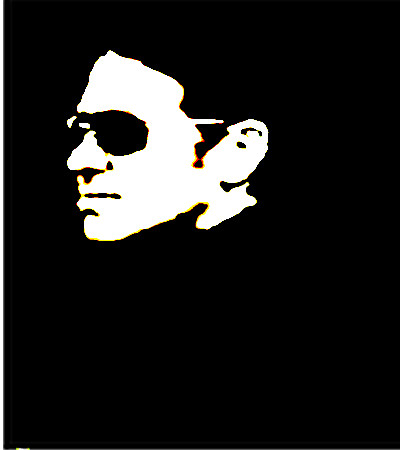
Leo Kenney, drawing

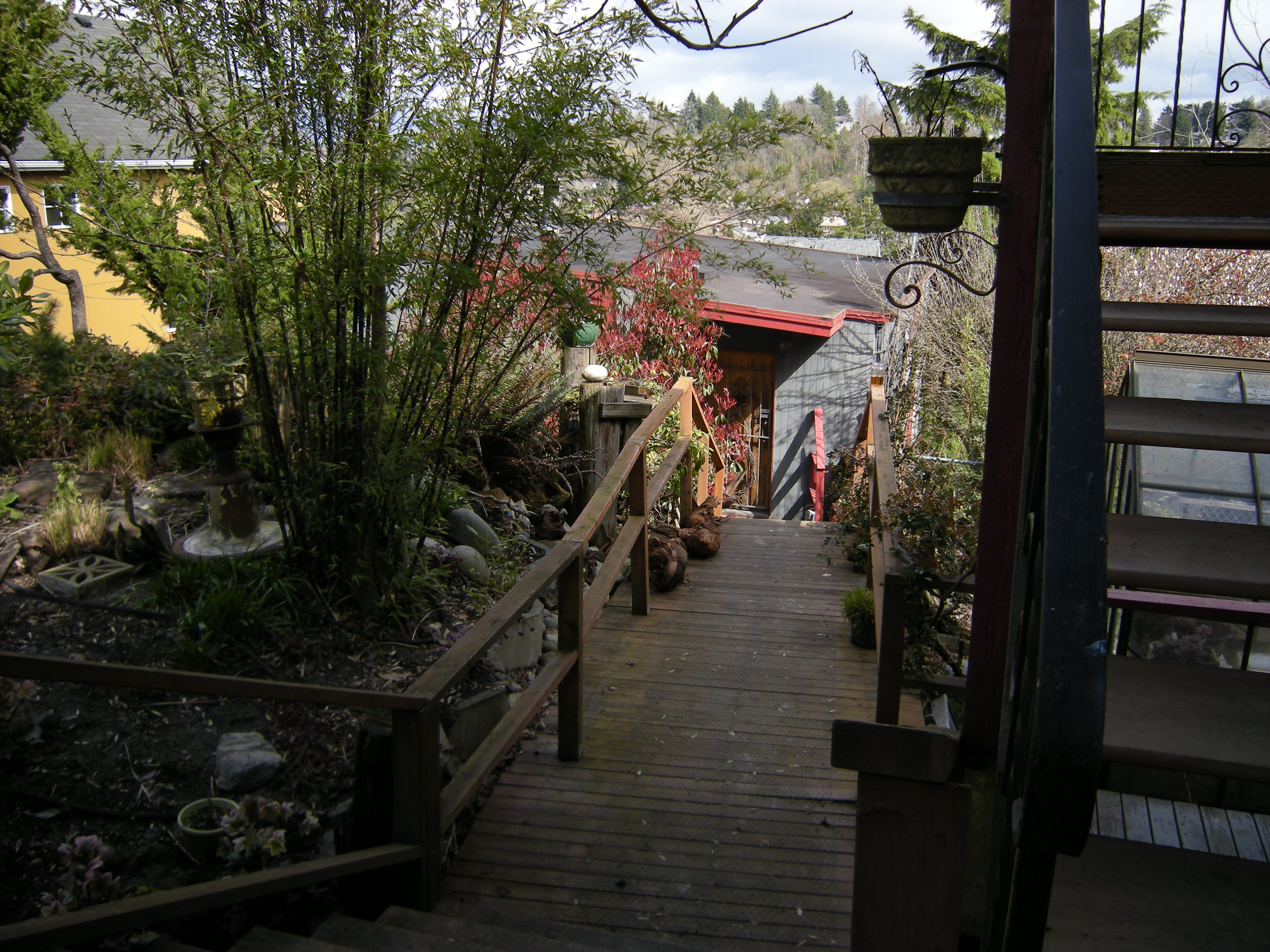
James W. Washington Jr.'s garden and studio in Seattle

Others

- Doris Totten Chase (1923–2008)
- William Cumming (1917–2010)
- Richard Gilkey (1925–1997)
- Paul Horiuchi (1906–1999)
- Clayton James (1918–2016)
- William Ivey (1919–1992)
- Helmi Juvonen (1903–1985)
- Leo Kenney (1925–2001)
- John Franklin Koenig (1924–2008)
- Philip McCracken (1928–2021)
- Neil Meitzler (1930–2009)
- Carl Morris (1911–1993)
- Hilda Grossman Morris (1911–1991)
- Ambrose McCarthy Patterson (1877–1966)
- Mary Randlett (1924–2019)
- Jay Steensma (1941–1994)
- George Tsutakawa (1910–1997)
- Windsor Utley (1920–1989)
- James W. Washington Jr. (1909–2000)
- Wesley Wehr (1929–2004)
