= Steensma =

Steensma is a surname. Notable people with the surname include:

- Andy Steensma (born 1942), American politician
- Jay Steensma (1941–1994), American artist
- Maria Steensma (born 2001), Dutch field hockey player
- Thomas D. Steensma, Dutch health psychologist

== See also ==
- Iris Steensma, fictional character
