= Kenjiro Nomura =

Kenjiro Nomura may refer to:

- Kenjiro Nomura (baseball)
- Kenjiro Nomura (artist)
