= Fox, Oregon =

Unincorporated community in the state of Oregon, United States

Coordinates: 44°38′56″N 119°08′39″W

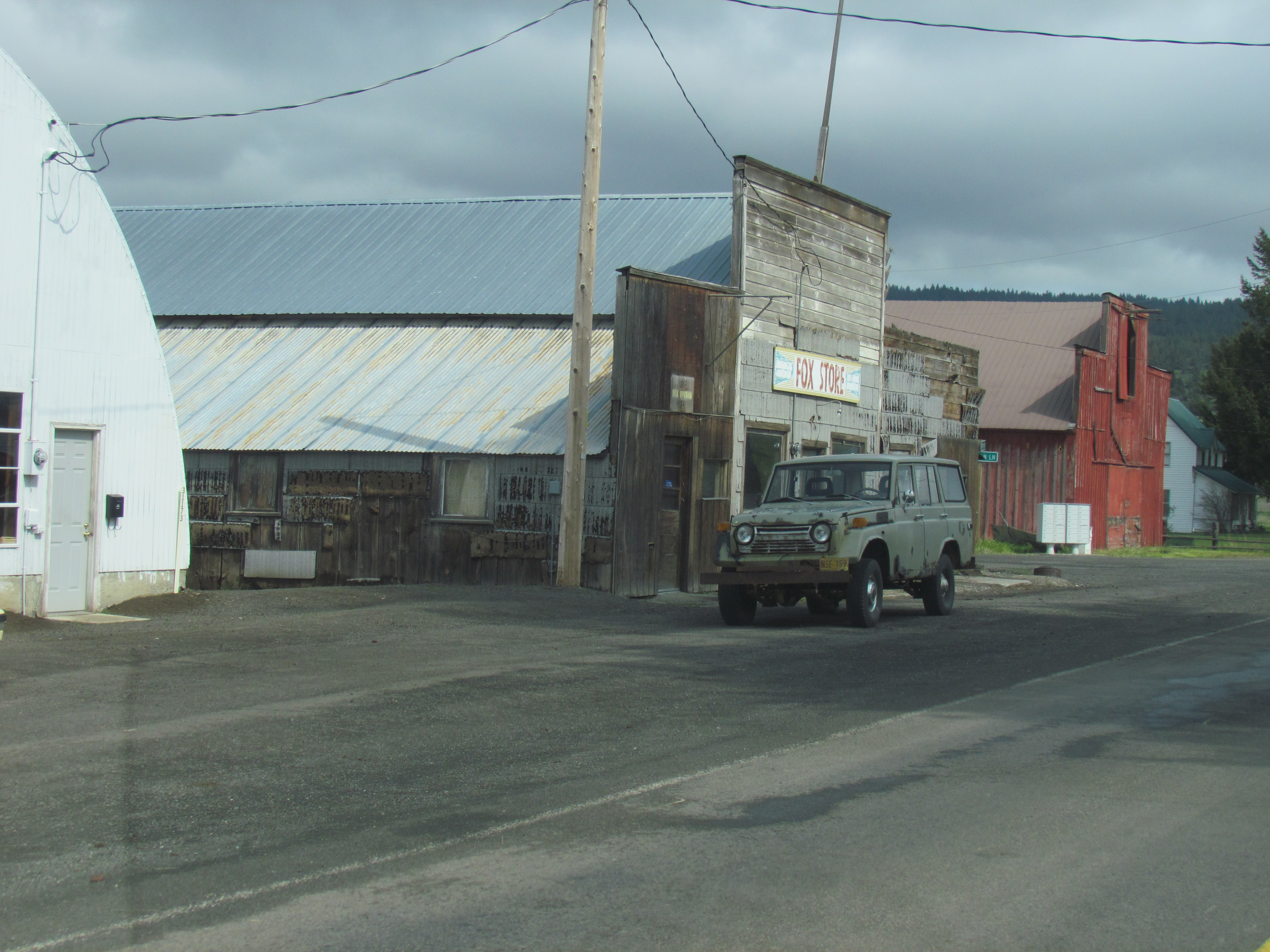
The Fox Store and other buildings in Fox

Fox is an unincorporated community in Grant County, Oregon, United States, on U.S. Route 395 south of Long Creek.

Fox is named after Fox Creek, a tributary of the North Fork John Day River. The creek was named for an incident involving a fox that occurred during a hunting or prospecting trip in pioneer times. Fox post office was established circa 1883 discontinued in 2002, and formerly had a ZIP code of 97831. Fox is now served by the Long Creek post office (ZIP code 97845).

Fox was the birthplace of noted artist Morris Graves.

== Climate ==
This region experiences warm (but not hot) and dry summers, with no average monthly temperatures above 71.6 °F. According to the Köppen Climate Classification system, Fox has a warm-summer Mediterranean climate, abbreviated "Csb" on climate maps.
