= Hans Jørgensen =

Hans Jørgensen (1886–1954) was the founder of Newar studies in the west. He published a Newar grammar and dictionary and studies of a number of newar texts. He received his doctorate in 1911 at Kiel University in Sanskrit and worked at the Museum für Völkerkunde in Berlin until 1919. In 1927 he traveled to England to consult Newar manuscripts at Cambridge with the support of the Carlsberg Foundation.

== Works of Hans Jørgensen ==
- Jørgensen, Hans (1921). "Ein Beitrag zur Kenntnis des Nevari". Zeitschrift der Deutschen Morgenländischen Gesellschaft 75: 213–236.
- Jørgensen, Hans (1936). A dictionary of the classical Newārī. Copenhagen: E. Munksgaard.
- Jørgensen, Hans (1941). A grammar of the classical Newārī. Copenhagen: E. Munksgaard
