= Banana messenger =

Banana messengers or fruit messengers were agents sent on US railroads to accompany shipments of bananas and other fruit. They were accorded special ticket rates, similar to those for railway employees and clergy, as late as the 1960s. The tickets were not honored on some premium trains. Reportedly, the reduced rate also applied to the return trip (sans bananas).

The name was also used to refer to some cabooses. Described in IC 9650-9956, these were steel underframe drover's cabooses built between 1897 and 1913, and reclassified as banana messengers sometime between 1955 and 1963. The last five were scrapped or sold between 1963 and 1971.
