= Zoe Dusanne =

American art dealer (1884–1972)

Zoë Dusanne (born Zola Maie Graves; March 24, 1884 – March 6, 1972) was an American art dealer, collector, and promoter who operated the Zoë Dusanne Gallery in Seattle, Washington from 1950 to 1964.

== Life and career ==
Dusanne was born Zola Maie Graves on March 24, 1884, in Newton, Kansas. From the age of nine she was raised in Council Bluffs, Iowa. She briefly attended both Oberlin College and the University of Illinois.

In 1912, she moved to Seattle, where she operated a beauty salon. In 1928, she moved to New York City and began collecting works by modern abstract artists such as Paul Klee, Piet Mondrian, Stuart Davis, Jean Arp, and Giorgio de Chirico.

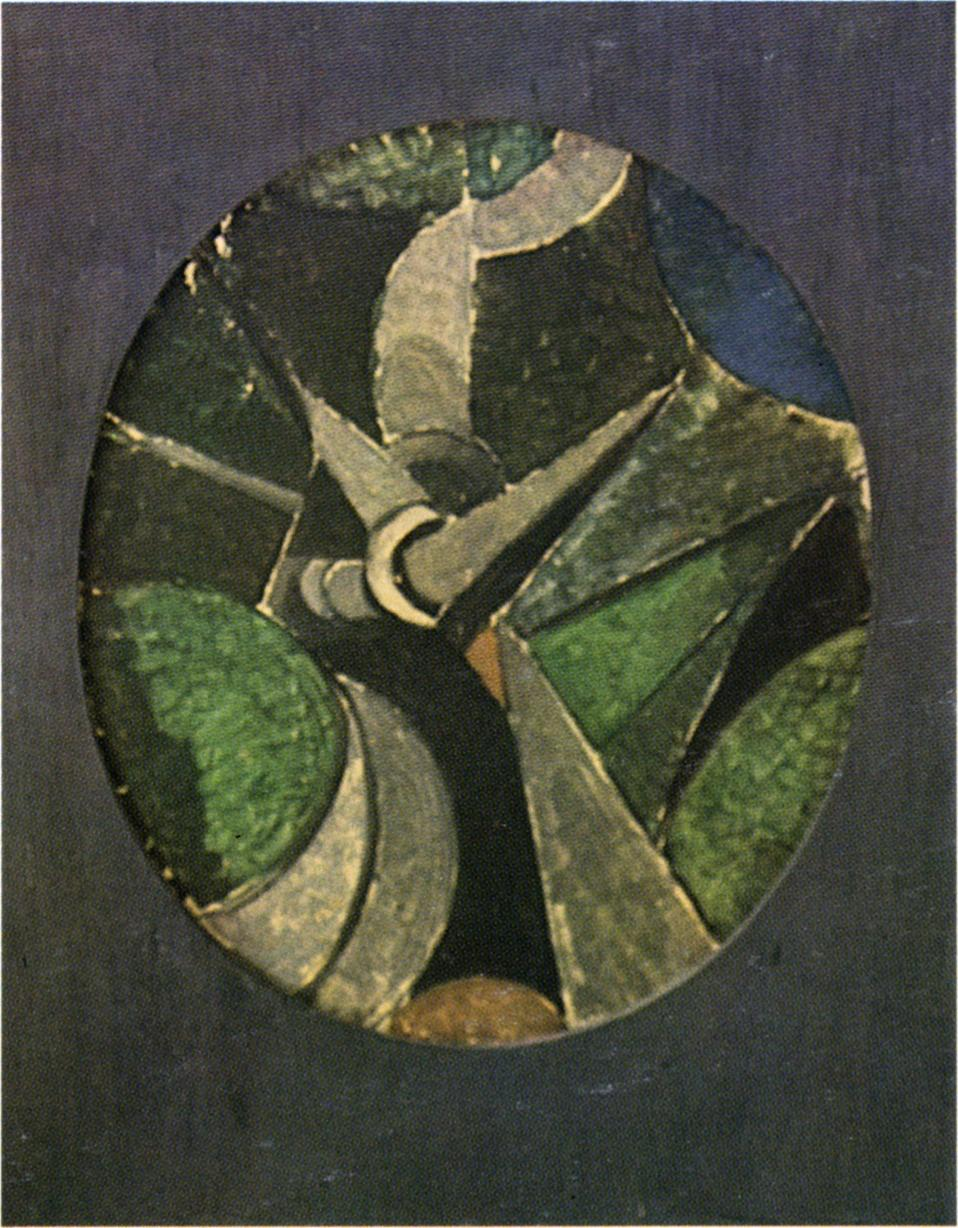
Landscape (1916), by Theo van Doesburg 004, purchased by Zoe Dusanne in 1947

On her return to Seattle in 1942, she began promoting advanced contemporary art, which had not previously been widely exhibited in the Pacific Northwest. She loaned pieces from her growing collection to the Seattle Art Museum and the Henry Art Gallery, and in 1950, opened the Zoë Dusanne Gallery.

She was an avid supporter of Northwest-based artists such as Guy Anderson, Kenneth Callahan, Morris Graves, Paul Horiuchi, Philip McCracken, Mark Tobey, and George Tsutakawa, and played an important role in bringing national attention to the 'Northwest School'. Her gallery was the first in North America to mount shows by Japanese artist Yayoi Kusama and French artist/poet Henri Michaux, and she was an early exhibitor of works by Sam Francis, Paul Jenkins, Karl Otto Götz, John Franklin Koenig, and many others.

In 1953, largely as a result of Dusanne's efforts, Life magazine ran a major article on the "Mystic Painters of the Northwest", which propelled Tobey, Graves, Callahan, and Anderson to national prominence.

In 1959, the custom-built Zoe Dusanne Gallery was demolished for construction of the Interstate 5 freeway; a second location lasted until 1964, at which time Dusanne retired.

She died in Seattle on March 6, 1972.
