= Kenjiro Nomura (artist) =

Japanese American artist (1896–1956)

Kenjiro Nomura, artist, 1952. Photo by Elmer Ogawa (detail) Special Collections, University of Washington Libraries.

Kenjiro Nomura (Japanese: 野村 建二郎, 1896–1956) was a Japanese American painter. Immigrating to the United States from Japan as a boy, he became a well-known artist in the Pacific Northwest in the 1920s and 30s.

In 1942, during the Second World War and after the signing of Executive Order 9066, Nomura and his family were incarcerated in the Minidoka Relocation Center. Sketches and paintings he made there over the next three years continue to be exhibited as an important record of the Japanese-American wartime experience.

Nomura eventually moved into abstract painting. He died in Seattle, Washington, in 1956.

== Early life and education ==
Kenjiro Nomura was born in 1896 in Gifu, Gifu Prefecture, Japan. In 1907, his family immigrated to the United States, settling in Tacoma, Washington. When he was sixteen, his parents returned to Japan, but Kenjiro chose to remain in the U.S.

In 1916, Nomura moved to Seattle and started working for a shopkeeper in the city's bustling Japantown / Nihonmachi neighborhood (later known as the International District). Within a year, he began working as an apprentice sign painter (most likely with Burgira Hirayama, the only known professional sign painter in Japantown at that time). He began taking lessons in the studio of Fokko Tadama, a prominent art teacher who instructed Nomura in the basic techniques of Western Art. A Dutch-Indonesian immigrant himself, Tadama often worked with Japanese-American students.

== Early career: 1920s and 30s ==
In 1922, after five years of study with Tadama, Nomura had some of his paintings selected by the Seattle Fine Art Society for inclusion in its Annual Exhibition of the Artists of the Pacific Northwest. The same year he and a friend, Show Toda, opened a sign painting business in Japantown. The following year they moved it to Sixth Ave. and Main St., in the heart of Nihonmachi, where it would remain for the next thirteen years. Combining their names, they called it Noto Sign Co. It soon became a successful business and a studio and hang-out for artists, as well as Nomura and Toda's home. Notable Nikkei artists who worked and socialized there at various times included Takuichi Fujii, George Tsutakawa, Paul Horiuchi, and Kamekichi Tokita.

Street, 1932, oil on canvas, by Kenjiro Nomura. Property of Seattle Art Museum. Photo: Paul Macapia.

After Toda got married and moved on in 1928, Tokita took his place as Nomura's business partner. The two men, who had met around 1921, would become inextricably linked, their very different ways of painting similar subjects providing contrast and context to each other's work. Long after their deaths their paintings would continue to be exhibited side by side.

In the 1920s Seattle's arts community was growing with an energy that continued even through the early years of the Great Depression. Nomura and his peers regularly appeared in the Seattle Art Institute's 'Northwest Annuals', and when the Seattle Art Museum opened in 1933, its first solo exhibition was of Nomura's work (both SAI and SAM, under the directorship of Dr. Richard Fuller, were descendants of the Seattle Fine Art Society). His work was also shown at the University of Washington's Henry Art Gallery, and, as his reputation spread, at the California Palace of the Legion of Honor in San Francisco and the Museum of Modern Art in New York City.

Nomura married in 1928, at which time he moved out of the Noto building. He and his wife Fumiko had a son, George, in 1930.

In 1935 Nomura was invited to join the Group of Twelve, a cooperative gathering of progressive artists including Kenneth Callahan and Ambrose Patterson. The Group's exhibitions proved popular, and several were held over the next couple of years.

Despite his successes as an artist, the deepening Depression was taking its toll. In 1933 he was happy to be paid $38.25 a week to produce several paintings for the federal Public Works of Art Project, some of which were shown at the Corcoran Gallery in Washington, D.C. In 1936, lack of business forced Nomura to close down Noto Sign Co.; he and Fumiko were eventually able to reestablish themselves by managing a dry-cleaning business in Seattle's University District.

== Wartime ==
Japanese immigrants in general were subject to discriminatory U.S. laws which barred them from owning property or becoming naturalized citizens. Racist groups periodically began campaigns for the removal of the so-called "Yellow Peril". The bombing of Pearl Harbor on December 7, 1941, led to intense suspicion of disloyalty and even sabotage on the part of Japanese-Americans. Executive Order 9066 enabled the U.S. military to remove all people of Japanese ancestry from the West Coast, including the Nisei, native-born U.S. citizens who in some cases spoke little or no Japanese. They were to be placed in relocation centers - for all intents and purposes, internment camps - far inland.

On April 12, 1942, Kenjiro Nomura and his family were transported to the Puyallup Assembly Center, where they were held for three months. They were then moved to the Minidoka Relocation Center in Idaho, where they were held for three years.

Nomura worked as a sign painter in the camp, which allowed him access to paint and brushes. Painting or sketching on whatever materials were available, he created a moving visual record of life in detention. Very few of his internment camp paintings utilized the blended, dark colors which gave a heavy tone to much of his previous work. Some of the works are as small as 5" by 8". One is rendered in crayon on construction paper. Although straightforward and representational, the subjects he chose give a greater insight to what internment was like. The Main Gate, with the Puyallup Fair's main gate building in the background, shows the fenced-off area and shed where visitors from the outside world could meet with the camp's residents. A military policeman, gun at his side, can be seen leaning against the visiting area's back fence. Guard Tower, painted during the winter of 1942-'43, shows a dark and ominous winter sky and a plane of snowy ground broken by a line of barbed wire fence. The Laundry and Sanitation Building, one of the few paintings to feature any people, shows a lone woman with a basket walking to the laundry building in a scene heavy with dull browns and greens.

== Later years ==
When the Nomuras returned to Seattle after the war, they had trouble finding work, and Nomura's ailing wife committed suicide in 1946. Nomura did not paint until 1947, when another local Japanese artist, Paul Horiuchi, helped him to recover from his losses and return to art. His experiments with abstraction attracted considerable interest, including exhibition at Seattle's Zoë Dusanne Gallery.

Nomura died in Seattle in 1956.

Painting Seattle: Kamekichi Tokita and Kenjiro Nomura was a major exhibition at the Seattle Asian Art Museum in 2011–12. Kenjiro Nomura: An Artist's View of the Japanese American Internment was shown at the Japanese American National Museum in 1997, and has had several other exhibitions.
