= Carl Morris (painter) =

American painter (1911–1993)

- Born: May 12, 1911; Yorba Linda, California, US
- Died: June 3, 1993 (aged 82)
- Occupation: Painter

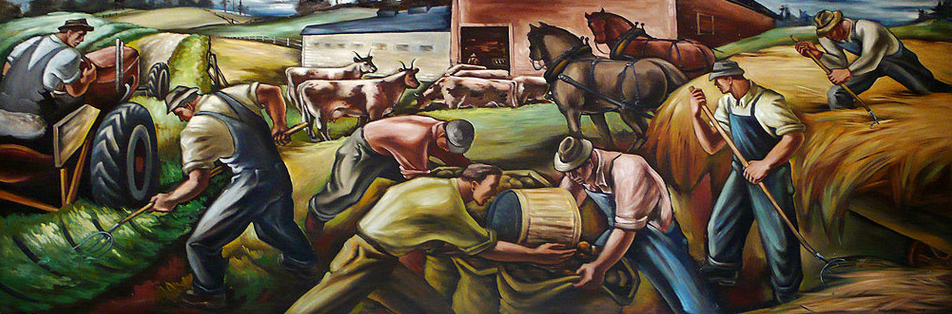
Agriculture (1943), Morris' mural for the post office in Eugene, Oregon

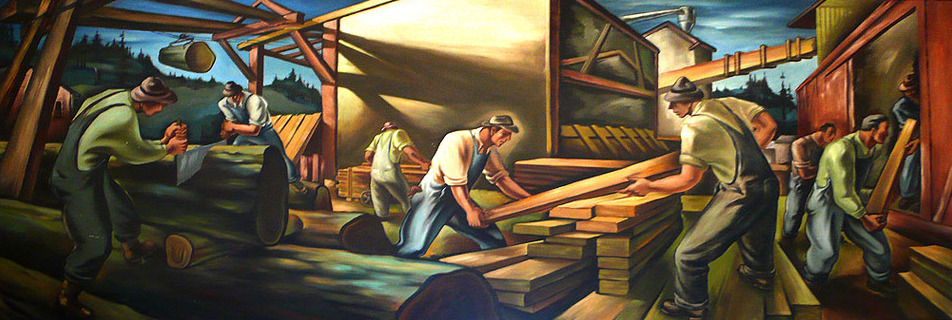
Lumbering (1943), Morris' mural for the post office in Eugene, Oregon

Carl A. Morris (May 12, 1911 – June 3, 1993) was an American painter, born in Yorba Linda, California. Morris studied at the Chicago Art Institute and in Paris and Vienna. He opened the Spokane Art Center through the Federal Art Project during the Great Depression. Morris met his wife, sculptor Hilda Grossman, when he recruited her as a teacher for the center. Moving to Seattle in 1940, they met Mark Tobey and became lifelong friends.

In 1941, Morris was commissioned by the Treasury Section of Fine Arts to paint murals for the post office in Eugene, Oregon. The Morrises settled in Portland, Oregon, and established their artistic careers, beginning as figurative artists and gradually moving toward abstract art. They often visited New York to see friends such as Mark Rothko, Robert Motherwell, Joseph Campbell and Lionel Trilling but declined to relocate, wanting to avoid what they saw as a climate of commercialism and artistic distraction. Morris is known today for his strong Abstract Impressionist paintings.

Morris' work can be seen in collections throughout the United States, including those of the Portland Art Museum, the Tacoma Art Museum, the Jordan Schnitzer Museum of Art, the Vollum Institute, Reed College, the Boise Art Museum, the Denver Art Museum, The Metropolitan Museum of Art, and the San Francisco Museum of Modern Art. During his life, his work was shown at the Whitney Museum of American Art and the Guggenheim Museum in New York City, the Art Institute of Chicago and the Seattle Art Museum.
