= Philip McCracken =

American visual artist (1928–2021)

Philip "Phil" McCracken (November 14, 1928 – June 6, 2021) was an American visual artist, who worked mainly in sculpture. Born in Bellingham, Washington, he graduated from the University of Washington in 1953, having interrupted his studies to serve as an army reservist for the Korean War. He then studied for a time under Henry Moore in England. He lived and made art on Guemes Island from 1955 to the end of his life in 2021.

His work contains much nature imagery, is generally representational, and displays a strong focus on visual form.

His work has been exhibited at the Smithsonian Institution, the Art Institute of Chicago, and the Museum of Northwest Art. His art can also be seen as part of Washington's State Art Collection at My Public Art Portal.

== Bibliography ==
- Deloris Tarzan Ament (2002). Iridescent Light: The Emergence of Northwest Art. University of Washington Press. ISBN 0-295-98147-4.
- Deloris Tarzan Ament and Philip McCracken (2004). 600 Moons: Fifty Years Of Philip McCracken's Art. University of Washington Press. ISBN 0-295-98411-2.
