= Whatcom Museum =

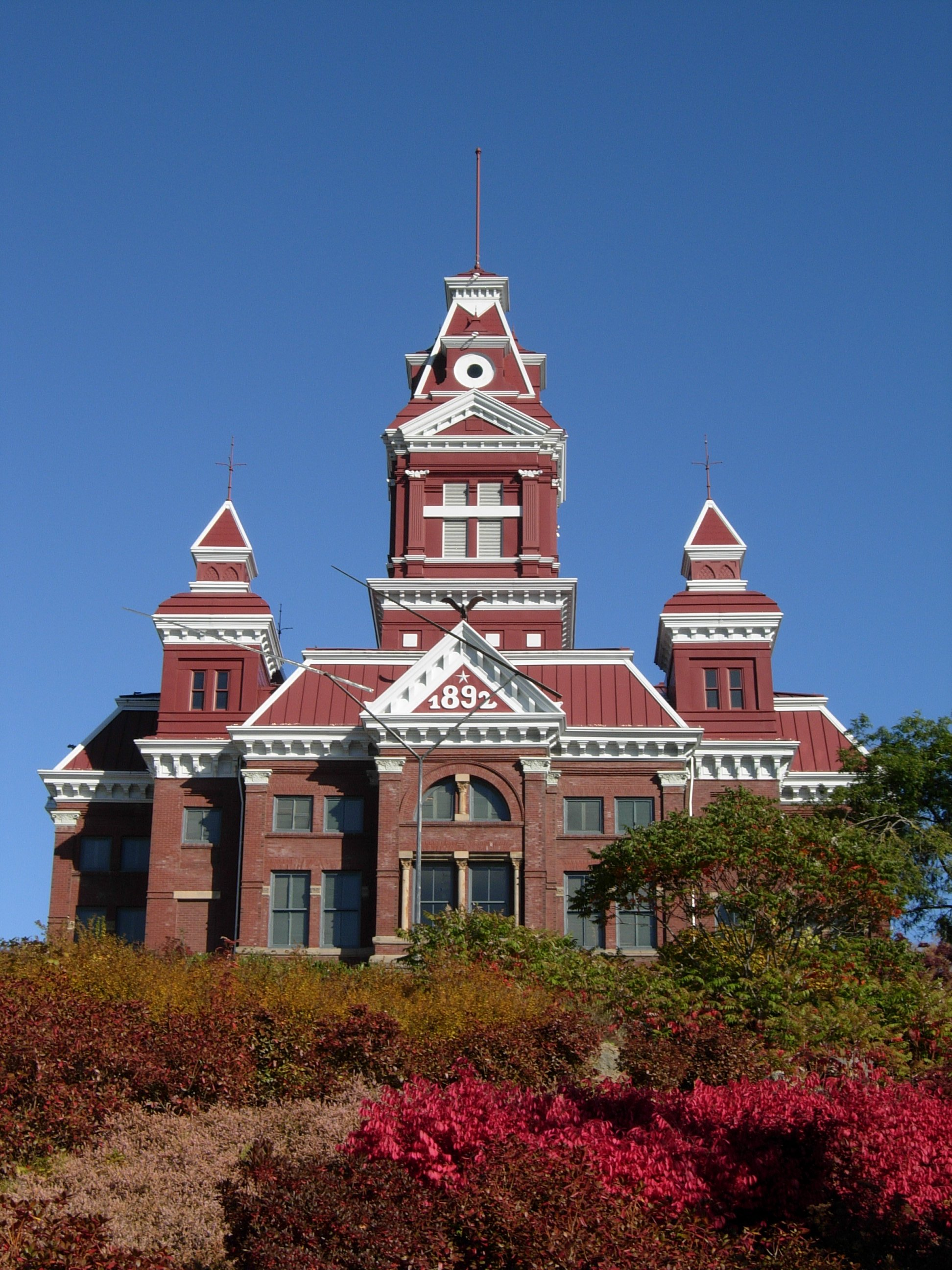
- Old City Hall as seen from Maritime Heritage Park

- Location within Washington (state) Location within the United States
- Location: Bellingham, Washington
- Type: Art museum, History museum
- Accreditation: American Alliance of Museums
- Architects: Olson Kundig Architects, Lightcatcher Building
- Website: www.whatcommuseum.org
- Old City Hall
- U.S. National Register of Historic Places
- Location: Bellingham, Washington
- Coordinates: 48°45′10″N 122°28′48″W
- Built: 1892
- Architect: Alfred Lee
- Architectural style: Late Victorian
- NRHP reference No.: 70000648
- Added to NRHP: April 03, 1970

The Whatcom Museum is a natural history and art museum located in Bellingham, Washington. Accredited by the American Alliance of Museums, the Whatcom Museum has a three building campus that includes Old City Hall, Old Fire Station No.1, and The Lightcatcher.

== About ==
The Whatcom Museum was established as a non-profit organization in 1982. The museum has a three building campus that includes Old City Hall, Old Fire Station No.1, and The Lightcatcher which encloses the Family Interactive Gallery (FIG).

The museum is jointly managed by the City of Bellingham and the Whatcom Museum Foundation.

=== Architecture ===
The Old City Hall building was originally built in 1892 for the former town of New Whatcom. The original building was designed in a Late Victorian style by Alfred Lee, a local architect, who used red brick and Chuckanut sandstone for its construction. The design itself was an almost exact replica of the second Saginaw County Courthouse in Saginaw, Michigan (1884, destroyed 1971), designed by Fred W. Hollister.

At the time of construction, the building was situated on a bluff above Bellingham Bay. However, over the years, significant amounts of the waterfront were filled in to make more land. Currently, the building sits above Maritime Heritage Park.

The building served as city hall until 1936, and became part of the museum in 1941. In 1962, fire damaged the building, but efforts from the community raised money to restore the building.

In 2009, the Whatcom Museum opened a location in the newly designed The Lightcatcher. The Lightcatcher, designed by Seattle-based Olson Kundig Architects, is named for its 37 feet high and 180 feet long translucent wall, which facilitates a number of energy saving strategies.

=== Collections ===
The Whatcom Museum houses a collection of over 30,000 objects.

Key holdings in the collection are the 4,000 plus items from the archives of Pacific Northwest photographers Darius Kinsey and Tabitha Kinsey.

The museum contains the John M. Edson Hall of Birds, which is a floor of hundreds of taxidermized birds, from the collection of John M. Edson.
