= Kenneth Callahan =

American painter

- Kenneth Callahan, circa 1980s

Kenneth Callahan (1905–1986) was an American painter and muralist who served as a catalyst for Northwest artists in the mid-20th century through his own painting, his work as assistant director and curator at the Seattle Art Museum, and his writings about contemporary art. Born in Eastern Washington and largely self-taught as an artist, Callahan was committed to an art that went beyond the merely illustrative. He enrolled at the University of Washington in 1924 but did not stay long. He traveled widely, absorbing influences from the different countries and cultures he experienced. His talent was recognized early; his work was included in the first Whitney Biennial exhibition in 1933 and he went on to a distinguished painting career. Callahan is identified as one of the Northwest Mystics – along with Guy Anderson, Morris Graves, and Mark Tobey, who shared a muted palette and strong interest in Asian aesthetics.

== Early life ==
Kenneth Callahan was born in Spokane, Washington, on October 30, 1905, the fifth of seven children of John and Martha Ann Cross Callahan. He spent his growing years in the small town of Glasgow, Montana. Encouraged by his mother, he began painting watercolors at age seven. In 1918 he moved with his family to Raymond, Washington, then two years later to Seattle, where he took art classes at Broadway High School. Both his parents died while he was still a teenager.

Callahan enrolled in the University of Washington, but left after two months. Moving to San Francisco, he did illustrations for a children's magazine, and, while living in low-rent apartments with other artists, had his first exposure to contemporary abstract art. At that time he was painting in a realist style inspired by Thomas Hart Benton and the artists of the Ashcan School, but he was deeply impressed by the originality of Klee, Kandinsky, and Feininger. He later told journalist Deloris Tarzan Ament, "It was the first time it occurred to me that there could be good art that I didn't like."

In 1926 Callahan had his first one-man show at San Francisco's Schwabacher-Frey Gallery; the following year he began his world travels as a ship's steward, winding up back in Seattle in 1930.

== Career ==
The Valley, 1961, Kenneth Callahan.

In 1930 Callahan married Margaret Bundy, who was a co-editor of Town Crier, a literary magazine published in Seattle between 1912 and 1937.

The Callahans developed friendships with Dr. Richard Fuller (founder of the Seattle Art Museum), Mark Tobey, Morris Graves, and other progressive-minded artists. Their home became a meeting-place for Seattle's arts community, including prominent Japanese-American artists Kenjiro Nomura and Kamekichi Tokita, and many others.

In 1933 - at age 27 - he gained national recognition with the inclusion of some of his paintings in the First Biennial Exhibition of Contemporary Art at the Whitney Museum, in New York. The same year he began his twenty-year tenure with SAM, when it opened its new building in Seattle's Volunteer Park. Over the next two decades he curated exhibitions at SAM, wrote a weekly arts column for The Seattle Times, and took trips to Europe and Latin America; his main focus, however, remained his painting. He had numerous exhibitions, was commissioned to do several murals (including post office murals for the Section of Painting and Sculpture in Anacortes and Centralia, Washington and Rugby, North Dakota), and helped form the Group of Twelve, an "independent salon" of Northwest artists. In the late 1930s he and his wife began spending much of their time in the Robe Valley area of the North Cascades mountains; during the Second World War he spent summers as a U.S. Forest Service fire lookout in the Cascades.

Margaret gave birth to their son Brian Tobey Callahan in 1938.

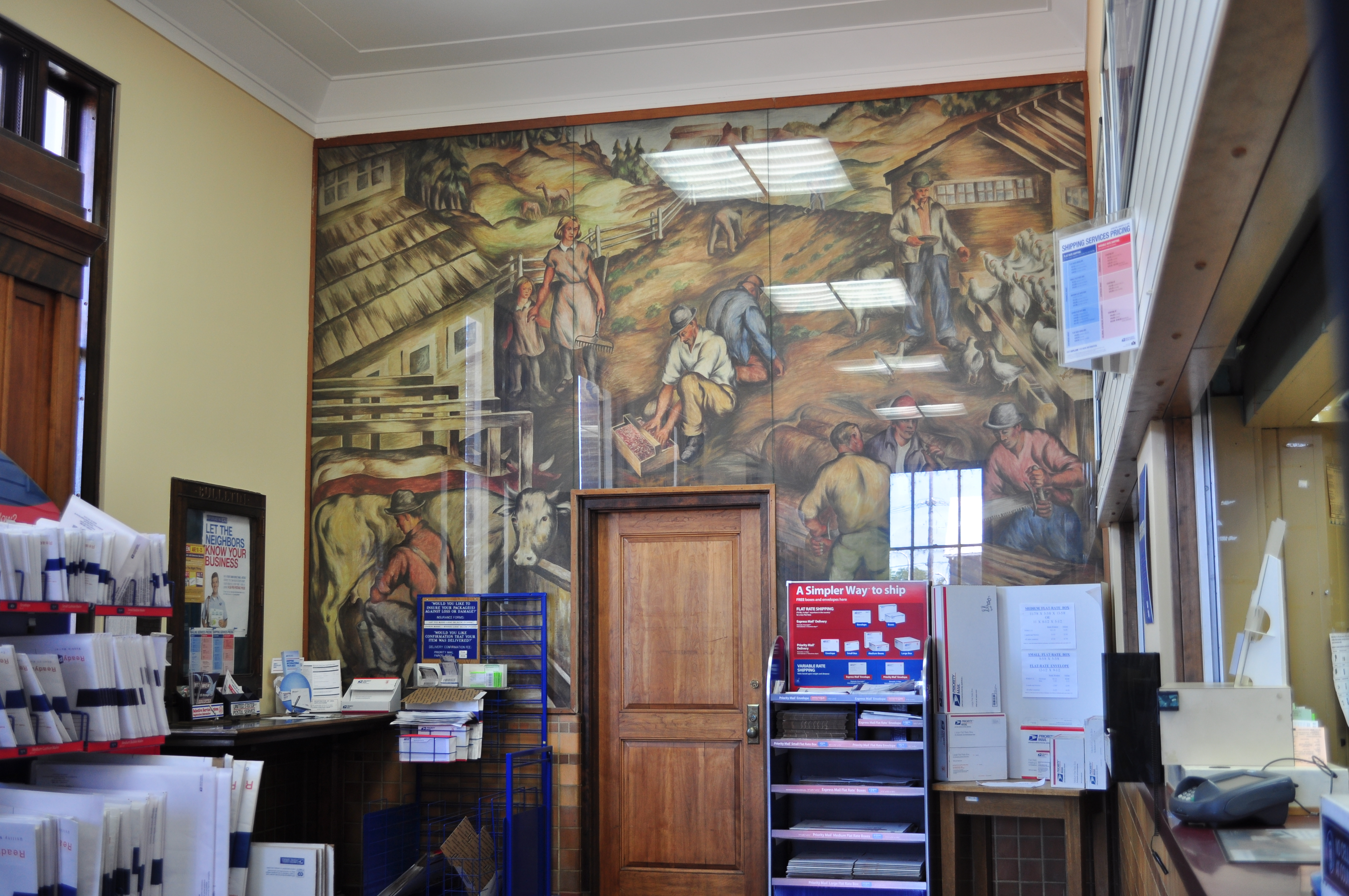
Callahan's mural Industries of Lewis County (oil on canvas, 1938) in the Main Post Office, Centralia, Washington.

Callahan was a somewhat controversial figure within the arts community, with some artists seeing conflict of interest in his positions as artist, curator, and critic. In 1953 he ceased working at SAM. Later that same year Life magazine ran an article with large color photos extolling Callahan, Graves, Anderson, and Tobey as the "Mystic Painters of the Pacific Northwest".

Dante's Inferno, undated, Kenneth Callahan

Callahan never considered himself to be a "mystic" painter. In writings and interviews he explained that he wasn't interested in symbolism; rather, he saw his work as being firmly rooted in nature and art history - as it plainly was through the early part of his career. By the early 1960s, however, his style had become much more complex - and seemingly rife with symbolism. "He liked muscle-bound grandeur," wrote arts journalist Regina Hackett, "but released the figures who displayed it from the confines of gravity. Full of light, many hover on the edge of floating away." Over time, figurative elements - men, horses, trees, insects - disappeared from his work, in favor of pure abstraction, but still, said Callahan, "It is nature, with its unlimited varied form, structure, and color that constitutes the vital living force from which art must basically stem."

While Callahan enjoyed his status as a respected artist, the increasingly abstract style of his painting did not lend itself to ready sales. He supplemented his income with occasional teaching jobs at various colleges, and in 1954 applied for and received a Guggenheim Fellowship.

In 1961 Margaret died of cancer; two years later his summer home/studio near the Stillaguamish River burned down while he was in Europe, with the loss of many paintings by both himself and friends.

He married Beth Inge Gotfredsen in 1964, and they moved to Long Beach, Washington, on the Pacific coast.

== Later years ==
Callahan continued painting in his studio near the shore in Long Beach, but at a more relaxed pace.

The Seventies saw two unusual commissioned works: In 1972 he designed costumes and sets for the Seattle Repertory Theatre's production of Macbeth, and in 1976, the owner of Longacres racetrack asked him to do a series of paintings of horses for an on-site restaurant. Callahan, a lifelong horse lover, enjoyed the assignment immensely.

In 1973, the Henry Art Gallery presented Universal Voyages, the most comprehensive retrospective of Callahan's work ever mounted.

In 1975, he was elected into the National Academy of Design as an Associate member, and became a full member in 1977.

In 1984 Callahan moved back to Seattle and turned his artistic attention to urban life, in contrast with the sea and light studies that dominated his work during two decades at Long Beach.

In May, 1986, following a brief illness, he died at his home in Seattle. He was 81.

== Legacy ==
Callahan's works are included in collections at the Metropolitan Museum, the Guggenheim, and the Museum of Modern Art in New York; the Corcoran Gallery, the Phillips Collection, and the Hirshhorn Museum in Washington, D.C.; the Chicago Art Institute, the San Francisco Museum of Modern Art, the Seattle Art Museum, and the Tacoma Art Museum. In 2014, several of his works were included in Modernism in the Pacific Northwest: the Mythic and the Mystical, a major exhibition at the Seattle Art Museum.

== Bibliography ==
- Conkelton, Sheryl, What It Meant to be Modern: Seattle Art at Mid-Century, Henry Art Gallery, Seattle 1999
- Conkelton, Sheryl, and Landau, Laura, Northwest Mythologies: The Interactions of Mark Tobey, Morris Graves, Kenneth Callahan, and Guy Anderson, Tacoma Art Museum, Tacoma WA; University of Washington Press, Seattle and London 2003
- Kingsbury, Martha, Art of the Thirties: The Pacific Northwest, University of Washington Press for Henry Art Gallery, Seattle and London 1972
- Orton, Thomas, and Watkinson, Patricia Grieve, Kenneth Callahan, Museum of Northwest Art, La Conner WA; University of Washington Press, Seattle and London, 2000
