= Mark Tobey =

American painter

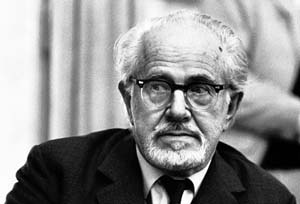
- Tobey in 1964
- Born: December 11, 1890; Centerville, Wisconsin, U.S.
- Died: April 24, 1976 (aged 85); Basel, Switzerland
- Education: School of the Art Institute of Chicago
- Known for: Painting
- Movement: Abstract Expressionism; Northwest School
- Patrons: Zoe Dusanne

Mark George Tobey (December 11, 1890 – April 24, 1976) was an American painter. His densely structured compositions, inspired by Asian calligraphy, resemble Abstract expressionism, although the motives for his compositions differ philosophically from most Abstract Expressionist painters. His work was widely recognized throughout the United States and Europe. Along with Guy Anderson, Kenneth Callahan, Morris Graves, and William Cumming, Tobey was a founder of the Northwest School. Senior in age and experience, he had a strong influence on the others; friend and mentor, Tobey shared their interest in philosophy and Eastern religions. Similar to others of the Northwest School, Tobey was mostly self-taught after early studies at the Art Institute of Chicago. In 1921, Tobey founded the art department at The Cornish School in Seattle, Washington.

Tobey was an incessant traveler, visiting Mexico, Europe, Palestine, Israel, Turkey, Lebanon, China, and Japan. After converting to the Baháʼí Faith, it became an important part of his life. Whether Tobey's all-over paintings, marked by oriental brushwork and calligraphic strokes, were an influence on Jackson Pollock's drip paintings has been left unanswered. Born in Centerville, Wisconsin, Tobey lived in the Seattle, Washington area for most of his life before moving to Basel, Switzerland in the early 1960s with his companion, Pehr Hallsten; Tobey died there in 1976.

== Early years ==
Tobey was the youngest of four children in a Congregationalist family. His parents were George Tobey, a carpenter and house builder, and Emma Cleveland Tobey. The father carved animals from stone and sometimes drew animals for young Mark to cut out with scissors. In 1893, the family settled in Chicago. He studied at the Art Institute of Chicago from 1906 to 1908, but, like others of the Northwest School, was mostly self-taught. In 1911, he moved to New York City where he worked as a fashion illustrator for McCall's. His first one-man show was held at Knoedler & Company in lower Manhattan, in 1917. The following year, Tobey came in contact with New York portrait artist and Baháʼí Juliet Thompson—an associate of Khalil Gibran—and posed for her. During the session, Tobey read some Baháʼí literature and accepted an invitation to Green Acre where he converted to the Baháʼí Faith. His conversion led him to explore the representation of the spiritual in art. In the following years, Tobey delved into works of Arabian literature and teachings of East Asian philosophy.

== Career ==
=== Early years ===
Tobey's arrival in Seattle in 1921 was in part an effort for a new start following a marriage and quick divorce. When his ex-wife found Tobey's address, she sent him a box of his clothes topped with a copy of Rudyard Kipling's The Light That Failed. In the following year, Tobey met Teng Kuei, a Chinese painter and student at the University of Washington, who introduced Tobey to Eastern penmanship, beginning Tobey's exploration of Chinese calligraphy. The beginning of his lifelong travels occurred in 1925 when he left for Europe, settling in Paris where Tobey met Gertrude Stein. He spent a winter at Châteaudun, and also traveled to Barcelona and Greece. In Constantinople, Beirut and Haifa, he studied Arab and Persian writing.

Upon returning to Seattle in 1927, Tobey shared a studio in a house near the Cornish School (with which he was intermittently associated) with the teenage artist, Robert Bruce Inverarity, who was 20 years younger. Inspired by Inverarity's high-school project, Tobey developed interest in three-dimensional form and carved some 100 pieces of soap sculpture. The next year, Tobey co-founded the Free and Creative Art School in Seattle with Edgar Ames, and in autumn, he taught an advanced art course at Emily Carr's Victoria studio.

In 1929, he participated in a show that marked a change in his life: a solo exhibition at Romany Marie's Cafe Gallery in New York. Alfred H. Barr, Jr., then a curator at the Museum of Modern Art (MoMA), saw the show and selected several pictures from it for inclusion in MoMA's 1930 exhibition: Painting and Sculpture by Living Americans. In 1931, Tobey became a resident artist of the Elmhurst Progressive School while teaching at Dartington Hall in Devon and painting frescoes for the school. He became a close friend of Bernard Leach, who was also on the faculty. Introduced by Tobey to the Baháʼí Faith, Leach became a convert. During his stay in Devon, Tobey found time to travel to Mexico (1931), Europe, and Palestine (1932). In 1934, Tobey and Leach traveled together through France and Italy, then sailed from Naples to Hong Kong and Shanghai, where they parted company. Leach went on to Japan, while Tobey remained in Shanghai visiting his old friend, Teng Kuei, before departing for Japan. Japanese authorities confiscated and destroyed an edition of 31 drawings on wet paper that Tobey had brought with him from England to be published in Japan. No explanation for their destruction has been noted; possibly they considered his sketches of nude men pornographic. In early summer, he studied Haiku poetry and calligraphy at a Zen monastery outside Kyoto before returning to Seattle in autumn.

Tobey's first solo exhibition at the Seattle Art Museum occurred in 1935; he also traveled to New York, Washington, D.C., Alberta, Canada, as well as Haifa for a Baháʼí pilgrimage. Sometime in November or December, while working at night at Dartington Hall and listening to the horses breathe in the field outside his window, he painted a series of three paintings, Broadway, Welcome Hero, and Broadway Norm, in the style that would become known as "white writing" (an interlacing of fine white lines).

=== Mid-career ===
Canticle, casein on paper, 1954

Tobey expected to return to teaching in England in 1938, but the mounting tensions of war building in Europe kept him in the US. Instead, he began to work on the Federal Art Project, under the supervision of Inverarity. In June 1939, when Tobey attended a Baháʼí summer program and overstayed his allotted vacation time, Inverarity dropped him from the Works Progress Administration (WPA) project. Tobey met the Swedish scholar, Pehr Hallsten (died 1965, Basel), in Ballard in 1939 and they became companions, living together from 1940. By 1942, Tobey's process of abstractionism was accompanied by a new calligraphic experiment. Marian Willard of the Willard Gallery in New York had seen some of Tobey's WPA paintings and gave him a show in 1944, which was considered to be a major success. In 1945, he gave a solo exhibition at the Portland Art Museum in Oregon, and the Arts Club of Chicago held solo shows of his work in 1940 and 1946. He studied the piano and the theory of music with Lockrem Johnson, and, when Johnson was away, with Wesley Wehr, who was introduced to Tobey in 1949 by their pianist friend Berthe Poncy Jacobson. Wehr, an undergraduate at the time, happily accepted the opportunity to serve as a stand-in music composition tutor for Tobey and over time became friends with him and his circle of artists, becoming a painter himself, as well as a chronicler of the group.

Tobey showed at New York's Whitney Museum in 1951. He also spent three months as guest critic of graduate students' work at Yale University on the invitation of Josef Albers, and had his first retrospective show at the California Palace of the Legion of Honor in San Francisco. In 1952, the film "Tobey, Mark: Artist" debuted in the Venice and Edinburgh film festivals. Acknowledging "academic responsibility," Hallsten enrolled in graduate school at the University of Washington's department of Scandinavian languages and literature in the early 1950s and, after receiving his master's degree, Tobey began referring to him by the honorific, Professor.

On September 28, 1953, Life magazine published an article on Tobey, Guy Anderson, Kenneth Callahan, and Morris Graves entitled, "Mystic Painters of the Northwest," which placed them in the national limelight. The four were considered founders of the Northwest School. He held a solo show at the Galerie Jeanne Bucher in Paris in 1955, and traveled to Basel and Bern. He began his ink wash paintings two years later. In 1958, he became the second American, after James Abbott McNeill Whistler, to win the International Grand Prize at the Venice Biennale.

=== Later years ===
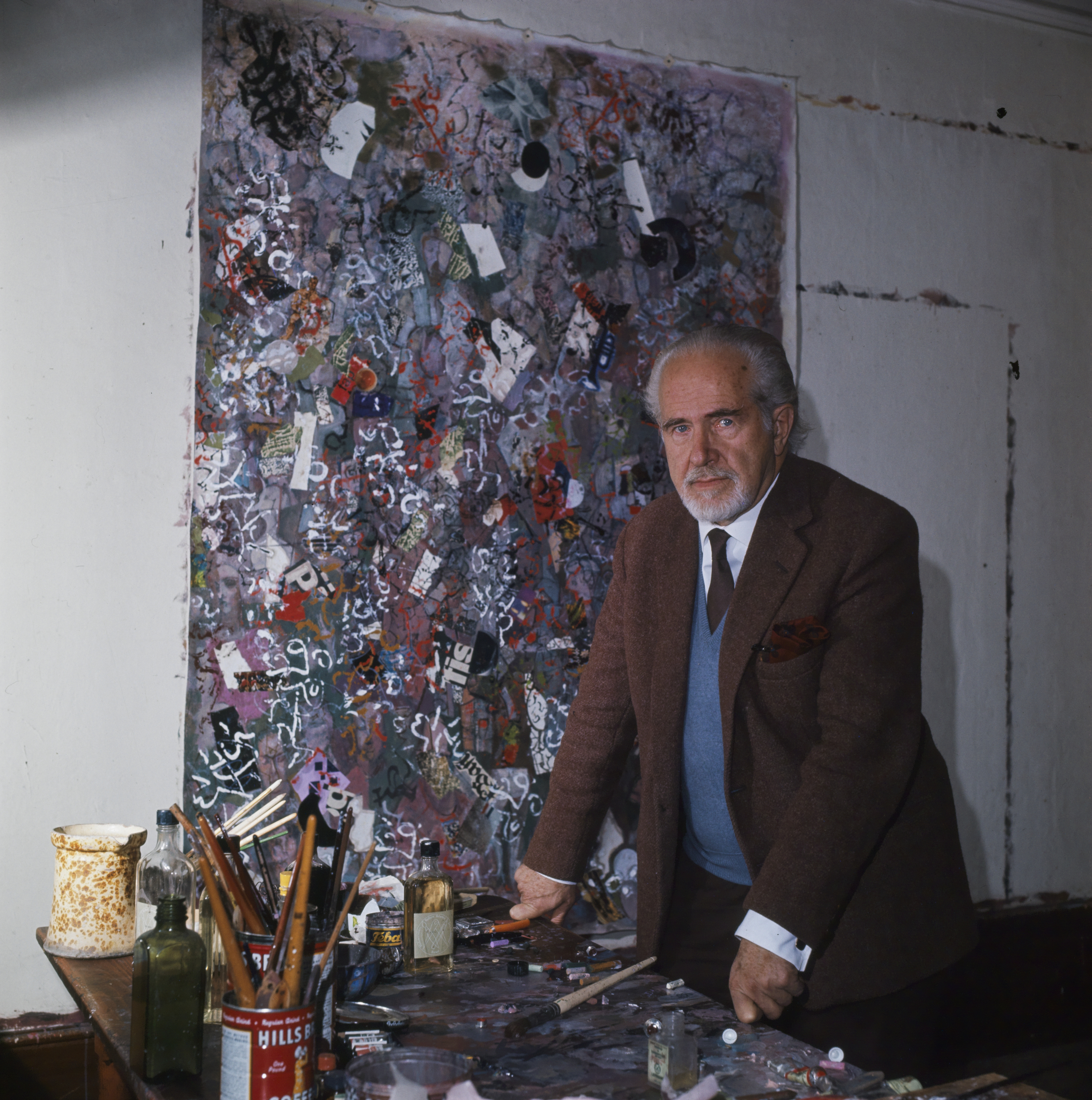
Mark Tobey in 1964

Tobey and Hallsten emigrated to Basel, Switzerland in the early 1960s. Tobey, who had been an incessant traveler in earlier years (Etulain 1996, p. 134), concentrated on his art, while Hallsten felt restless and traveled through Europe, returning to Basel. In 1960, Tobey participated in the Association of Visual Artists Vienna Secession, and in the following year, he became the first American painter to exhibit at the Pavillon de Marsan in Paris. Solo exhibits occurred at MoMA in 1962, and at the Stedelijk Museum in 1966, the same year that he visited the Baháʼí World Center in Haifa. In 1967, he showed again at the Willard Gallery, and held a retrospective show at the Dallas Museum of Fine Arts the following year. Another major retrospective of the artist's work took place at the Smithsonian's National Collection of Fine Arts in 1974. Tobey died in Basel in 1976.

In 2017 (from 6 May to 17 September), an important retrospective exhibition of Tobey's mature work was mounted in Venice, Italy, sponsored by the Peggy Guggenheim Collection, organized by the Addison Gallery of American Art Philips Academy of Andover, Massachusetts, and curated by Debra Bricker Balken. The exhibition was able to draw crowds from the Venice Biennale, gaining international attention and spurring an international reassessment of Tobey's significance before traveling to the Addison Gallery of American Arts, Phillips Academy, Andover, Massachusetts and exhibited 4 November 2017 to 11 March 2018.

== Style ==
Thanksgiving Leaf, aquatint, 1971

Tobey is most noted for his late "white writing" style, where an overlay of white or light-colored calligraphic brush strokes is painted over an abstract field of muted color, which is itself composed of small, interwoven brush strokes. This method, in turn, gave rise to the type of "all-over" painting style made most famous by Jackson Pollock and later painters.

When unveiling his white writing work at the Willard Gallery, where a lot of the future Abstract Expressionists were then exhibiting, Tobey did not want to confuse people as he was based in Seattle with strong ties to Asian art. Willard hired Sidney Janis (who would in 1948 open his own gallery in New York, pulling the Abstract Expressionists Jackson Pollock, Willem de Kooning, Robert Motherwell, and Philip Guston with him) to write an essay for the Tobey work at Willard to clarify Tobey's position. This essay both acknowledged Tobey's orientation toward Asia and emphasized an important distinction between his white writing and the automatic writing of the Surrealists which would inspire many of the American Abstract Expressionists. To quote Janis:

Nine years ago in 1935, Mark Tobey evolved the technique of white writing, which has distinguished his work. This method, a fusion of the spirit of Chinese writing with morphic characters rooted in twentieth-century painting, derives from Tobey's intensely personalized vision. ... It is presumably different from the psychic automation in [that it] is essentially under conscious direction.

Janis claimed that Tobey's style was "at odds with the latest iterations of modernism," because "Tobey's white writing was more studied and controlled, the outcome of prolonged deliberation." In this regard, Tobey's painting Threading Light (1942), which was in the Willard show of 1944, has been compared to Pollock's Night Mist of 1945 and André Masson's Automatic Drawing of 1924, which is an example of work directly influenced by Surrealist automatic writing.

== Influence ==
Tobey, the senior of the 'mystical painters', was an influence on Graves. Tobey studied piano and music theory with John Cage, and thereafter, it was Tobey who had an influence on Cage.

Elizabeth Bayley Willis showed Tobey's painting Bars and Flails to Jackson Pollock in 1944. Pollock studied the painting closely and then painted Blue Poles, a painting that made history when, in 1973, the Australian government bought it for $2 million. A Pollock biographer wrote: "...[Tobey's] dense web of white strokes, as elegant as Oriental calligraphy, impressed Jackson so much that in a letter to Louis Bunce he described Tobey, a West Coast artist, as an 'exception' to the rule that New York was 'the only real place in America where painting (in the real sense) can come thru." Pollock went to all of Tobey's Willard Gallery shows where Tobey presented small to medium-sized canvases, measuring approximately 33 by 45 inches (840 mm × 1,140 mm). After Pollock viewed them, he went back home and blew them up to 9 by 12 feet (2.7 m × 3.7 m), pouring paint onto the canvas instead of brushing it on. Pollock was never really concerned with diffused light, but he was very interested in Tobey's idea of covering the entire canvas with marks up to and including its edges, something not done previously in American art.

Helmi Juvonen, another Northwest School artist and diagnosed manic-depressive, was obsessed with Tobey, and suffered the delusion that she and Tobey were to be married, even though Tobey was gay.

== Legacy ==
At least five of his works are in the permanent collections of the Museum of Northwest Art. Tobey's work can also be found in most major museums in the U.S. and internationally, including the Smithsonian American Art Museum, the Tate Gallery in London, the Museum of Modern Art in New York City, the Metropolitan Museum of Art, and the Whitney Museum of American Art. There have been at least four posthumous individual exhibitions of Tobey's work: National Gallery of Art, Washington, D.C., USA, 1984; Museum Folkwang, Essen, Germany, 1989; Galerie Beyeler, Basel, Switzerland, 1990; and Museo Nacional Centro de Arte Reina Sofía, Madrid, Spain, November 11, 1997 – January 12, 1998 where the exhibition brought together about 130 works from some 56 different collections, covering the years from 1924 to 1975. Two of Tobey's paintings are in Guggenheim collections. A number of his figurative and abstract works are held by the Dartington Hall Trust. Four of Tobey's signed lithographs hang in the reception hall in the Seat of the Universal House of Justice, the supreme governing institution of the Baháʼí Faith, as his work was inspired by Oriental influences and his involvement in the Baháʼí Faith.

Anatoma tobeyoides, a species of sea snail, is named in honor of Tobey.

== Awards ==
- 1968, "Commander, Arts and the Letters of the French Government"
- 1961, won first prize, Carnegie International, Pittsburgh
- 1959, became the first American since James McNeill Whistler to win the Painting Prize at the Venice Biennale
- 1956, elected at the National Institute of Arts and Letters
- 1956, Guggenheim International Award
