= Morris Graves =

American painter (1910–2001)

- Morris Graves, 1938. Photo by Robert Bruce Inverarity. Archives of American Art, Smithsonian Institution
- Born: August 28, 1910; Fox Valley, Oregon
- Died: May 5, 2001 (aged 90); Loleta, California
- Known for: Painting
- Movement: Abstract Expressionism, Northwest School

Morris Cole Graves (August 28, 1910 – May 5, 2001) was an American painter. He was one of the earliest Modern artists from the Pacific Northwest to achieve national and international acclaim. His style, referred to by some reviewers as Mysticism, used the muted tones of the Northwest environment, Asian aesthetics and philosophy, and a personal iconography of birds, flowers, chalices, and other images to explore the nature of consciousness.

An article in a 1953 issue of Life magazine cemented Graves's reputation as a major figure of the 'Northwest School' of artists. He lived and worked mostly in Western Washington, but spent considerable time traveling and living in Europe and Asia, and spent the last several years of his life in Loleta, California.

== Early years ==
Morris Cole Graves was born August 28, 1910, in Fox Valley, Oregon, where his family had moved about a year before his birth, from Seattle, Washington, in order to claim land under the Homestead Act. He was named in honor of Morris Cole, a favored minister of his Methodist parents. He had five older brothers, and eventually, two younger siblings.

Constant winds and cold winters made it much more difficult than expected to establish a working farm, and the struggle led to bankruptcy of the senior Graves's once-thriving paint and wallpaper store in Seattle. In 1911, a few months after Morris's birth, the family returned to the Seattle area, settling north of the city in semi-rural Edmonds, Washington.

He was a self-taught artist with natural understandings of color and line.

Graves dropped out of high school after his sophomore year, and between 1928 and 31, along with his brother Russell, visited all the major Asian ports of call as a steamship hand for the American Mail Line. On arriving in Japan, he wrote:

There, I at once had the feeling that this was the right way to do everything. It was the acceptance of nature not the resistance to it. I had no sense that I was to be a painter, but I breathed a different air.

== Career ==
=== Rambling ===
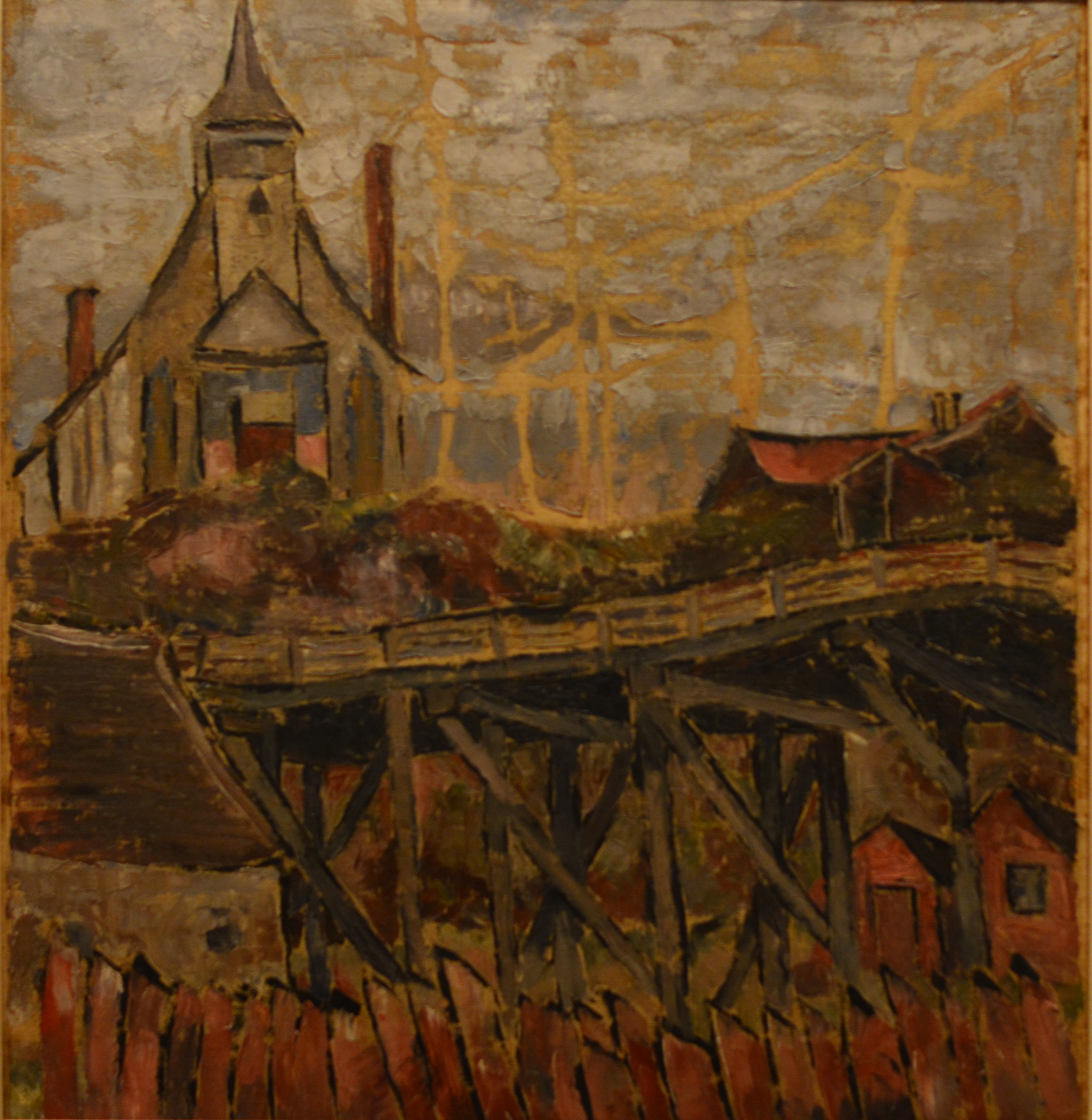
Church at Index, 1934, painted for the Works Projects Administration

In his early twenties, Graves finished high school in 1932 in Beaumont, Texas, while living with his maternal aunt and uncle. He then returned to Seattle, and received his first recognition as an artist when his painting Moor Swan (1933) won an award in the Seattle Art Museum's Northwest Annual Exhibition and was purchased by the museum. He split his time between Seattle and La Conner, Washington, where he shared a studio with Guy Anderson. Graves's early work was in oils and focused on birds touched with strangeness, either blind, or wounded, or immobilized in webs of light.

Graves began his lifelong study of Zen Buddhism in the early 1930s. In 1934, he built a small studio on family property in Edmonds, Washington. When it burned to the ground in 1935, almost all of his work to date was lost with it. His first one-man exhibition was in 1936 at the Seattle Art Museum (SAM); that same year he began working under Bruce Inverarity at the Seattle unit of the WPA's Federal Art Project. His participation was sporadic, but it was there that he met Mark Tobey and became impressed with Tobey's calligraphic line. In January 1937 Graves traveled to New York City to study with the controversial Father Divine's International Peace Mission movement in Harlem; on his return, in May, he bought 20 acres (81,000 m^{2}) on Fidalgo Island. In 1938 he quit the FAP and went to the Virgin Islands and Puerto Rico to paint.

Dove of the Inner Eye, Morris Graves, 1941, opaque watercolor on oiled paper

In 1940, Graves began building a house, which he named The Rock, on an isolated promontory on his Fidalgo Island property. He lived at The Rock with a succession of cats and dogs, all called Edith, in honor of poet Edith Sitwell.

=== The Rock ===
Graves was known for his personal charm and bursts of puckish humor, but also spent long periods in semi-isolation, absorbed in nature and his art. At the Rock, with the Second World War erupting, he retreated for a particularly long time and created a very large number of paintings. Many of them, such as Dove of the Inner Eye (1941) and Bird in the Night (1943), featured what would become Graves's iconic motif of birds trapped in layers of webbing or barbs, representing the artist's fears for the survival of man and nature in the face of modern industry and warfare. His near-isolation was interrupted in the spring of 1942 when the Museum of Modern Art in New York opened its Americans 1942: 18 Artists from 9 States exhibition. Critics raved over Graves's contributions, all of which were quickly snapped up by museums and collectors. At the same time the U.S. Army came looking for him, as he had failed to achieve the conscientious objector status he had applied for. There was also suspicion of him due to his association with the International Peace Mission and the fact that among his few regular visitors at the Rock had been the brilliant Japanese-American designer George Nakashima and his Japanese-born wife Miriam, prior to their being sent to the Minidoka relocation center. While his work was receiving further exhibition in New York and Washington D.C., and phenomenal sales, the artist himself spent much of that same time in the stockade at Camp Roberts, California, where he went into a deep depression. He was finally released from military service in March 1943.

With help from longtime supporters Elizabeth Willis, Nancy Ross, and Marian Willard, owner of the Willard Gallery in New York, Graves's work continued to enjoy popularity throughout the war years and beyond, with numerous exhibitions. In the late 40s he purchased land in Woodway, Washington, and began construction of a unique cinderblock house he came to call "Careladen".

=== Careladen years ===
Graves received a Guggehheim Fellowship allowing him to study in Japan, but only made it as far as Hawaii before his entry was blocked by Japan's U.S. military occupation authorities. He spent several months in 1947 painting and learning the Japanese language in Hawaii.

By the late 1940s Graves's and Mark Tobey's moment as the stars of the New York art world had faded, supplanted by the post-war rise of Action Painting and pure Abstraction.

Hibernation, Morris Graves, 1954

In 1949 Graves sailed to England aboard RMS Mauretania, spending a month as the guest of art collector Edward James. He then spent three solitary winter months in France, sketching and painting the Chartres Cathedral. This austere interlude may have been in response to critical complaints of superficiality in his more recent paintings; however, after returning to Seattle in 1950, he destroyed most of his Chartres works.

In 1952 photographer Dody Weston Thompson used part of her Albert M. Bender grant to photo document the unique home and surroundings of Graves, whom she considered a close friend.

In the spring of 1953, Graves staged the first Northwest art "Happening", sending invitations to everyone on the Seattle Art Museum mailing list:

You or your friends are not invited to the exhibition of Bouquet and Marsh paintings by the 8 best painters in the Northwest to be held on the afternoon and evening of the longest day of the year, the first day of summer, June 21, at Morris Graves's palace in exclusive Woodway Park.

Guests, some in formal evening wear, arrived to find the driveway blocked by a trench; investigating on foot, they found a banquet table with a ten-day-old turkey feast being drenched by a garden sprinkler as dinner music and farm animal sounds played over speakers. With Graves and his cohorts refusing to answer the door, guests, amused and otherwise, responded by storming off, sketching the scene, or filching silverware from the table.

In September 1953, largely through the efforts of Seattle gallery owner Zoe Dusanne, Life magazine ran a major article on the "Mystic Painters of the Northwest", focusing on Graves, Mark Tobey, Kenneth Callahan, and Guy Anderson as the major figures of a perceived Northwest School of artists. Ironically, by this time the four had for the most part fallen out over various personal, political, and artistic issues, and were barely on speaking terms with each other.

Graves's mid-career works were influenced by East Asian philosophy and mysticism, which he used as a way of approaching nature directly, avoiding theory. He adopted certain elements of Chinese and Japanese art, including the use of thin paper and ink drawing. He painted birds, pine trees, and waves. Works such as Blind Bird showed the influence of Mark Tobey, who was in turn inspired by Asian calligraphy. Graves switched from oils to gouaches, his birds became psychedelic, mystic, en route to transcendence. The paintings were bold, applied in a thick impasto with a palette knife, sometimes on coarse feed sacks.

In the 1950s, Graves returned to oils, but also painted in watercolor and tempera.

=== In Ireland ===
By 1954 Graves was feeling oppressed both by resurgent popularity and the encroachment of suburban development around his home. After spending several weeks in Japan, he rented Careladen to the poet Theodore Roethke and moved to Ireland. With companions Richard Svare and Dorothy Schumacher he lived in various parts of the country before settling on Woodton Manor, a rustic 18th century house near Dublin. In Ireland he created paintings known as the Hibernation series and became fascinated with the night sky. This led to Instruments for a New Navigation, a collection of precisely rendered bronze, glass, and stone sculptures inspired by the dawning Space Age. Finding no market for these unusual pieces, they were disassembled and not displayed again until 1999.

Graves returned to Seattle in 1964, living for several months in the so-called Pletscheff Mansion.

== Later years ==
In 1965 Graves purchased 380 acres of redwood forest property, around a five-acre lake, in Loleta, California, near Eureka. He hired architect Ibsen Nelsen to design a home which, after numerous technical and financial problems, was eventually constructed beside the lake. Graves would live on this property, which he called simply 'The Lake', for the remaining 35 years of his life. Although a sign posted at the entrance to the property read "No visitors today, tomorrow, or the day after", Graves's assistant Robert Yarber lived there with him much of the time, and he occasionally allowed visits by family members and old friends.

In his sixties, Graves began a new phase of minimalist paintings of floral arrangements, works with a simplicity intended as a statement about the nature of beauty. He unpacked the "Instruments of a New Navigation" sculptures and completed them. He continued working in his garden, tending his flowers and manicuring the landscape of The Lake.

Morris Graves died the morning of May 5, 2001, at his home in Loleta, hours after suffering a stroke.

== Legacy ==
=== Museum ===
The Morris Graves Museum of Art, located in the restored Carnegie library building in Eureka, California, bears his name and contains a small collection of his works and much of his personal collection of works by other artists.

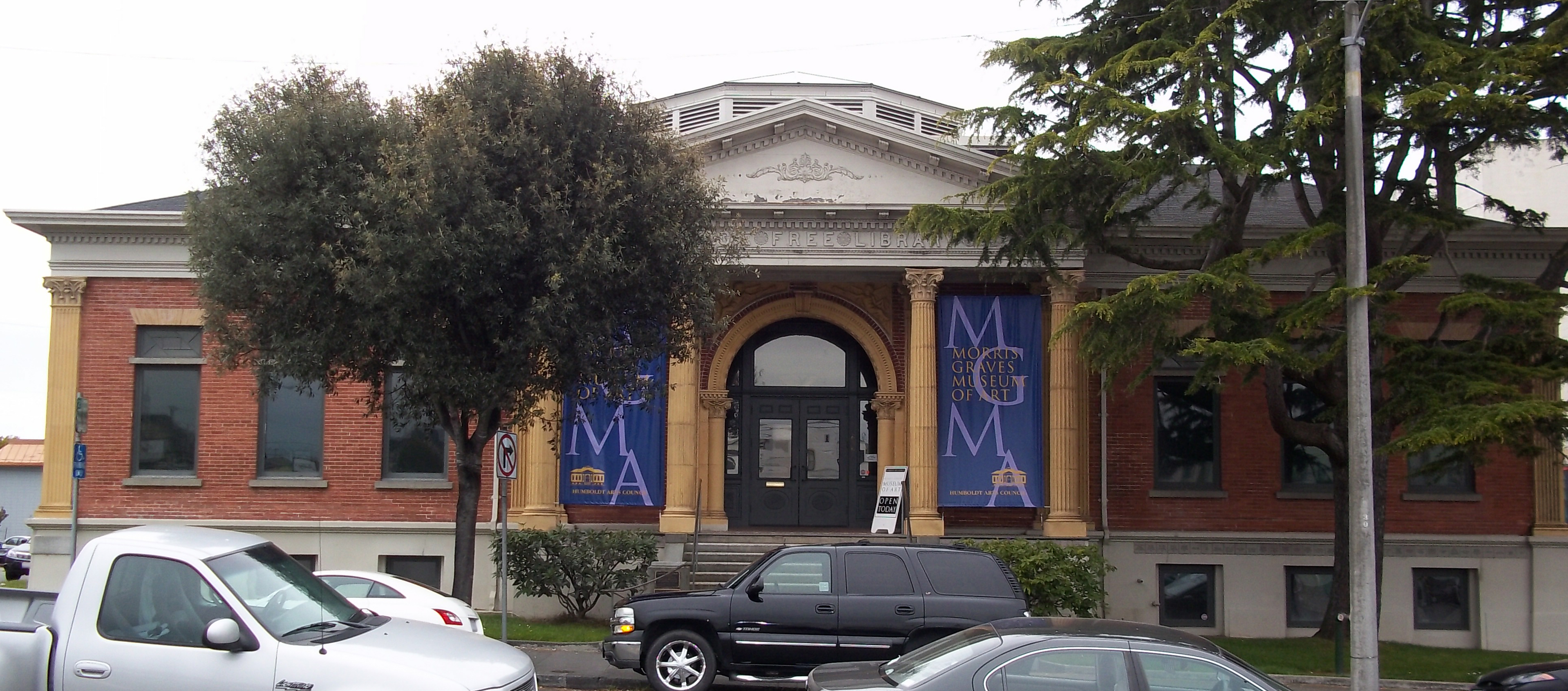
The Morris Graves Museum in Eureka, California, was formerly a Carnegie Free Library and is on the National Register of Historic Places.

=== Collections ===
Works by Morris Graves are included in the collections of the Art Institute of Chicago, the Fine Arts Museums of San Francisco, the Jordan Schnitzer Museum of Art (Eugene, Oregon), the Museum of Modern Art (New York City), the Whitney Museum of American Art (New York City), the National Gallery of Art (Washington D.C.), the San Francisco Museum of Modern Art, the Smithsonian American Art Museum (Washington D.C.), The Phillips Collection (Washington D.C.), the Ackland Art Museum (Chapel Hill, N.C.), the Addison Gallery of American Art (Andover, Massachusetts), the Akron Art Museum (Akron, Ohio), the Brauer Museum of Art (Valparaiso, Indiana), the Cleveland Museum of Art, the Figge Art Museum (Davenport, Iowa), the Harvard Art Museums (Boston, Massachusetts), the Hirshhorn Museum and Sculpture Garden (Washington D.C.), the Los Angeles County Museum of Art, the Maier Museum of Art (Lynchburg, Virginia), the Memorial Art Gallery (Rochester, New York), the North Carolina Museum of Art (Raleigh, N.C.), the Pennsylvania Academy of the Fine Arts (Philadelphia, PA), the Philadelphia Museum of Art, the Huntington Library (San Marino, California), the University of Mississippi Museum (Oxford, Miss.), the Walker Art Center (Minneapolis, Minn.), the Seattle Art Museum, the Tacoma Art Museum (Tacoma, Wash.), the Henry Gallery (Seattle, Wash.), the Museum of Northwest Art (La Conner, Wash.), Old Jail Art Center (Albany, Texas), and many other institutions.

=== Exhibitions ===
(Partial listing of group and solo shows featuring Graves's work; some dates approximate)

- 1936 – Seattle Art Museum, solo
- 1942 – Museum of Modern Art (NYC), Americans 42: 18 Artists from 9 States
- 1942 – Willard Gallery (NYC), solo. note: Graves's work was shown regularly at the Willard until its closing in 1987.
- 1942 – Phillips Memorial Gallery (Washington, D.C.), Three Americans: Weber, Knaths, Graves
- 1943 – Arts Club of Chicago, solo
- 1943 – Detroit Institute of Arts, solo
- 1943 – University Gallery (Minneapolis), solo
- 1943 – Museum of Modern Art (NYC), Romantic Painting in America
- 1956 – Whitney Museum (NYC), retrospective
- 1956 – Phillips Gallery (Washington, D.C.), retrospective
- 1956 – Museum of Fine Arts (Boston), retrospective
- 1956 – Des Moines Art Center, retrospective
- 1957 – M. H. de Young Museum (San Francisco), retrospective
- 1957 – Art Galleries of U.C.L.A. (Los Angeles), retrospective
- 1983 – Morris Graves: Vision of the Inner Eye, traveling exhibition curated by Ray Kass, organized by The Phillips Collection; toured The Phillips Collection (Washington, D.C.), Whitney Museum of American Art (New York), Oakland Museum (California), Seattle Art Museum, San Diego Museum of Art, and Greenville County Museum of Art (South Carolina).
- 2000 – Schmidt Bingham Gallery (NYC), Instruments for a New Navigation.
- 2010 – Henry Art Gallery (Seattle), Vortexhibition Polyphonica'
- 2014 – Seattle Art Museum, Modernism in the Pacific Northwest: The Mythic and the Mystical.
- 2017 – Woodside Braseth Gallery, Important Paintings & Drawings by Northwest Master Morris Graves (1910-2001)
- 2019 – Cascadia Art Museum, The Lavender Palette: Gay Culture and the Art of Washington State

Pendant of The Mystic Sons of Morris Graves, group formed in 1991 by artist Charles Krafft and Larry Reid to honor Graves's work and spirit
