= Anne Stone =

Anne Stone may refer to:

- Anne Stone (writer), Canadian writer, teacher, and editor
- Anne Stone (academic), American anthropological geneticist
- Anne Belle Stone (1874–1949), American artist
