= James FitzGerald (artist) =

American sculptor

James Herbert FitzGerald (1910–1973) was an American sculptor from Seattle, Washington. He received a degree in architecture at University of Washington and worked at Spokane Art Center. He has been called "[one] of the Pacific Northwest's preeminent artists of [his] period", and "among the most innovative modern artists active in the Pacific Northwest."

He was born and raised in Seattle, graduating from the University of Washington in 1935. FitzGerald went on to study at Yale University in 1938, where he received a Carnegie Graduate Fellowship, and at the Kansas City Art Institute. He created works for the Treasury Relief Art Project (TRAP) and the Department of Justice in the 1930s with Boardman Robinson; and worked on other Works Progress Administration art programs in Washington state. While he also studied as a painter, FitzGerald switched primarily to bronze sculpture in 1959 and became a well-known fountain designer. He established his own foundry in 1964.

FitzGerald married Margaret Tomkins, a painter, and had three children.

== Selected works ==
- Department of Justice murals (with Boardman Robinson)
- Bas relief panels at the east portals of the Mount Baker Tunnel, Seattle, a designated Seattle landmark
- Waterfront Fountain, Waterfront Park, Seattle
- Centennial Fountain, Marina Park, Kirkland, Washington
- Fountain of the Northwest, Intiman Theatre at Seattle Center
- Tile mosaic, Washington State Library, Washington State Capitol campus, Olympia, Washington
- Fountain of Freedom (a.k.a. Scudder Plaza Fountain), Woodrow Wilson School of Public and International Affairs, Princeton University
- Rain Forest, as part of the Western Washington University Public Sculpture Collection
