= Z. Vanessa Helder =

American watercolor painter (1904–1968)

- Z. Vanessa Helder, c. 1945
- Born: Zama Vanessa Helder; May 30, 1904; Lynden, Washington
- Died: May 1, 1968 (aged 63); Los Angeles
- Occupation(s): Artist, painter

Z. Vanessa Helder (May 30, 1904 – May 1, 1968) was an American watercolor painter who gained national attention in the 1930s/40s, mainly for her paintings of scenes in Eastern Washington. She painted with a bold, Precisionist style not commonly associated with watercolor, rendering landscapes, industrial scenes, and houses with a Magic Realist touch that gave them a forlorn, isolated quality, somewhat in the manner of Charles Sheeler and Edward Hopper. She spent most of her career in the Pacific Northwest (later moving to California), but was popular in New York art galleries, was a member of the National Association of Women Painters and Sculptors, and, in 1943, was included in a major exhibit at the Museum of Modern Art.

She continued painting and exhibiting after moving to Los Angeles with her husband, architect Jack Paterson, but her career was slowed by the post-war rise of Abstract Expressionism, and later by the health problems of both her and her husband. They died a few days apart, in 1968.

For many years Helder's work was out of vogue and largely forgotten by the public, but the power of her art has gradually been rediscovered, particularly in the Pacific Northwest. The Tacoma Art Museum held an exhibition of her work in 2013, and the Northwest Museum of Arts and Culture in Spokane has her twenty-two piece series relating to the construction of the Grand Coulee Dam – generally considered her masterwork – in its permanent collection.

== Early life ==
Zama Vanessa Helder was born May 30, 1904, in the town of Lynden, near Bellingham, in Whatcom County, Washington.

The name "Zama" (which Helder disliked) was taken from the ancient Carthaginian battle site where Hannibal was defeated by the Romans, reputed to be a place of spiritual energy, making it significant to her parents, who were interested in Theosophism and Spiritualism. Her father, Rynard, was a businessman; her mother, Anna, was a music and art lover who gave young Vanessa her first painting lessons. She had a brother, R. Wright Helder, who became a professional photographer.

She became proficient in landscape painting with watercolor at an early age. She graduated from Whatcom High School and studied at the University of Washington before winning, in 1934, a scholarship to the Art Students League of New York. There, she studied under well-known artists such as Robert Brackman, Frank DuMond, and George Picken.

== Career ==
In New York, Helder quickly attracted notice. She gained membership in both the Association of Women Painters and Sculptors and the American Watercolor Society, which led to inclusion in group shows at prominent galleries, and eventually representation by the Grant Studio, and later the Macbeth Gallery.

Although she painted a variety of subjects in a variety of locations, her realist yet unearthly Northwest landscapes proved popular in New York, and she regularly traveled back to Washington to go on painting trips with friends such as Ebba Rapp and Blanche Losey, who were fellow members of the Women Painters of Washington association.

Petit Mansion, 1942, Z. Vanessa Helder.

In 1937, Helder moved to Seattle to take up a Works Progress Administration (WPA) job offered by Bruce Inverarity, the Federal Art Project director for Washington. This included painting murals at the Washington State Capitol in Olympia and at Sand Point Naval Air Station in Seattle (both now lost). She entered several paintings in the Northwest Annuals, and had a solo exhibition at the Seattle Art Museum. In 1939, at Inverarity's request, she began teaching classes in watercolor, oil painting, and lithography at the Spokane Art Center, working alongside avant-gardists such as Margaret Tomkins, Carl Morris, and Guy Anderson. As an established professional working in a more traditional style, she was somewhat out of place on the faculty, but was able to spend a great deal of time roaming about Eastern Washington, painting landscapes. It was in this period, from 1939 to 1941, that she painted the Grand Coulee series, often cited of as her best work. Wrote Seattle Times art critic Michael Upchurch in 2013:

"The contrast in these, between geometric structures (the dam in progress, the outbuildings arrayed around it) and the more organic flow of the dam's natural surroundings (scalloped desert hills, plunging watercourses), continually draws the eye. 'Sand and Gravel Works', for instance, is a whole symphony of interconnected inclines, angles, slopes and shadows. 'Jackhammer Crew' makes the most of the interplay between standing human forms, their drills and coiling drill hoses and the craggy rock beneath them. [...] There's a thrilling dynamism to the way she mixes stone outcrop, flowing water and sky reflection in these paintings."

Sand and Gravel Works, ca. 1940, Z. Vanessa Helder. Collection of Northwest Museum of Arts and Culture.

After moving back to Seattle in 1941, Helder married industrial architect Robert J.S. "Jack" Paterson. Following the Pearl Harbor attack, she joined the Washington State Artists Council for Defense. She continued exhibiting locally and nationally, and in 1943 reached a high point in her career when works of hers were selected for inclusion in American Realists and Magic Realists, a major exhibition at the Museum of Modern Art (MoMA) in New York. A dozen of her paintings were hung alongside works by John James Audubon, Winslow Homer, Edward Hopper, Charles Sheeler, and Andrew Wyeth.

Following the triumph of the MoMA show, Helder moved to Los Angeles to be with her husband, who had moved there for work reasons. With her typical energy and sense of professionalism, she joined the California Watercolor Society, did volunteer work with wounded soldiers, lectured on art, continued to exhibit in New York, and, in 1945, had a solo show at the Los Angeles County Museum of Art. From 1952 to 1955 she taught at the Los Angeles Art Institute.

== Later years ==
Helder made some attempt to keep pace with post-war changes in artistic taste, but was eventually squeezed out of the New York galleries by the popularity of Abstract Expressionism. In the Pacific Northwest she came to be overshadowed by Mark Tobey, Morris Graves, Guy Anderson, and other artists of the "Northwest School". Nevertheless, she remained a well-respected "WPA artist" and master of watercolor.

Aware of its artistic and cultural value, Helder had resisted selling pieces of the Grand Coulee series individually, finally selling the complete collection to the Eastern Washington State Historical Society (now the Northwest Museum of Arts and Culture) in 1954.

Both Helder and her husband suffered from poor health, and she spent much of her energy in her last years caring for him. She died on May 1, 1968, a week after her husband, in Los Angeles.

== Legacy ==
Helder's works have been exhibited at the Whitney Museum of American Art, the Metropolitan Museum of Art, and the Museum of Modern Art in New York; the Oakland Museum, the Denver Art Museum, and the Seattle Art Museum; the Los Angeles County Museum of Art; Cascadia Art Museum in Edmonds, WA and Western Washington University in Bellingham, WA; and numerous other museums and galleries. In 2013 the Tacoma Art Museum presented a major retrospective of her work, and the Northwest Museum of Arts and Culture in Spokane, WA has displayed her Grand Coulee series on several occasions.

Her work is in the permanent collections of the Seattle Art Museum, the Smithsonian American Art Museum, the Newark Museum, the High Museum of Art in Atlanta, GA, the Portland Art Museum, the Philadelphia Museum of Art, the St. Louis Art Museum, the American Academy of Arts and Letters, N.Y., IBM Corporation, and the Northwest Museum of Art and Culture in Spokane.

Her art has been documented in the books Austere Beauty: The Art of Z. Vanessa Helder by Margaret Bullock and David F. Martin and An Enduring Legacy: Women Painters of Washington, by Martin.
