= Doris Chase =

Doris Chase may refer to:

- Doris Chase (Arrowverse)
- Doris Chase (DC Comics)
- Doris Totten Chase (1923–2008), American artist
