= Waterfront Fountain =

Fountain and sculpture in Seattle, Washington, U.S.

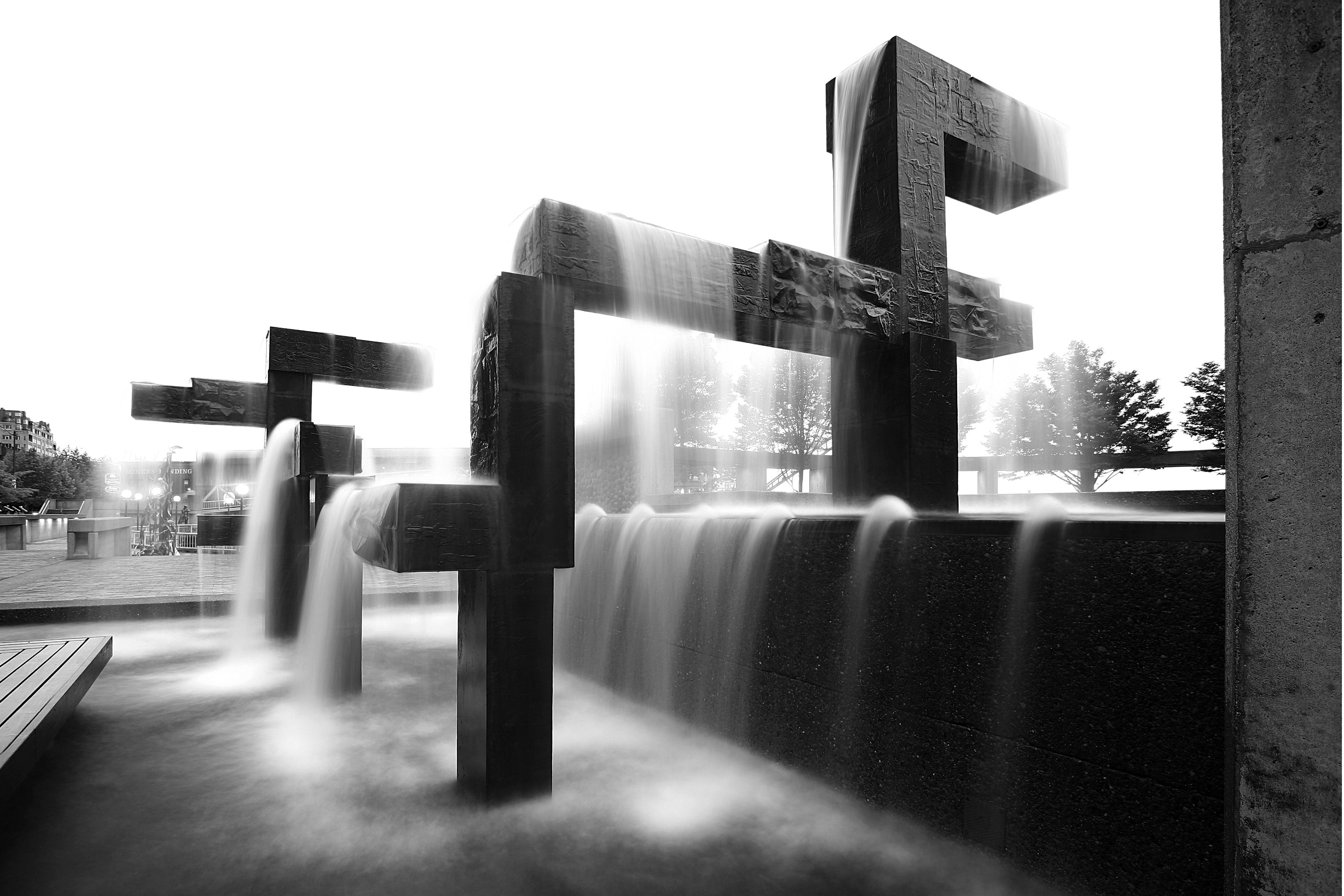
- The fountain in 2010
- Artist: James FitzGerald; Margaret Tomkins
- Year: 1974
- Condition: Restored
- Location: Seattle, Washington, U.S.
- 47.606464°N 122.341499°W

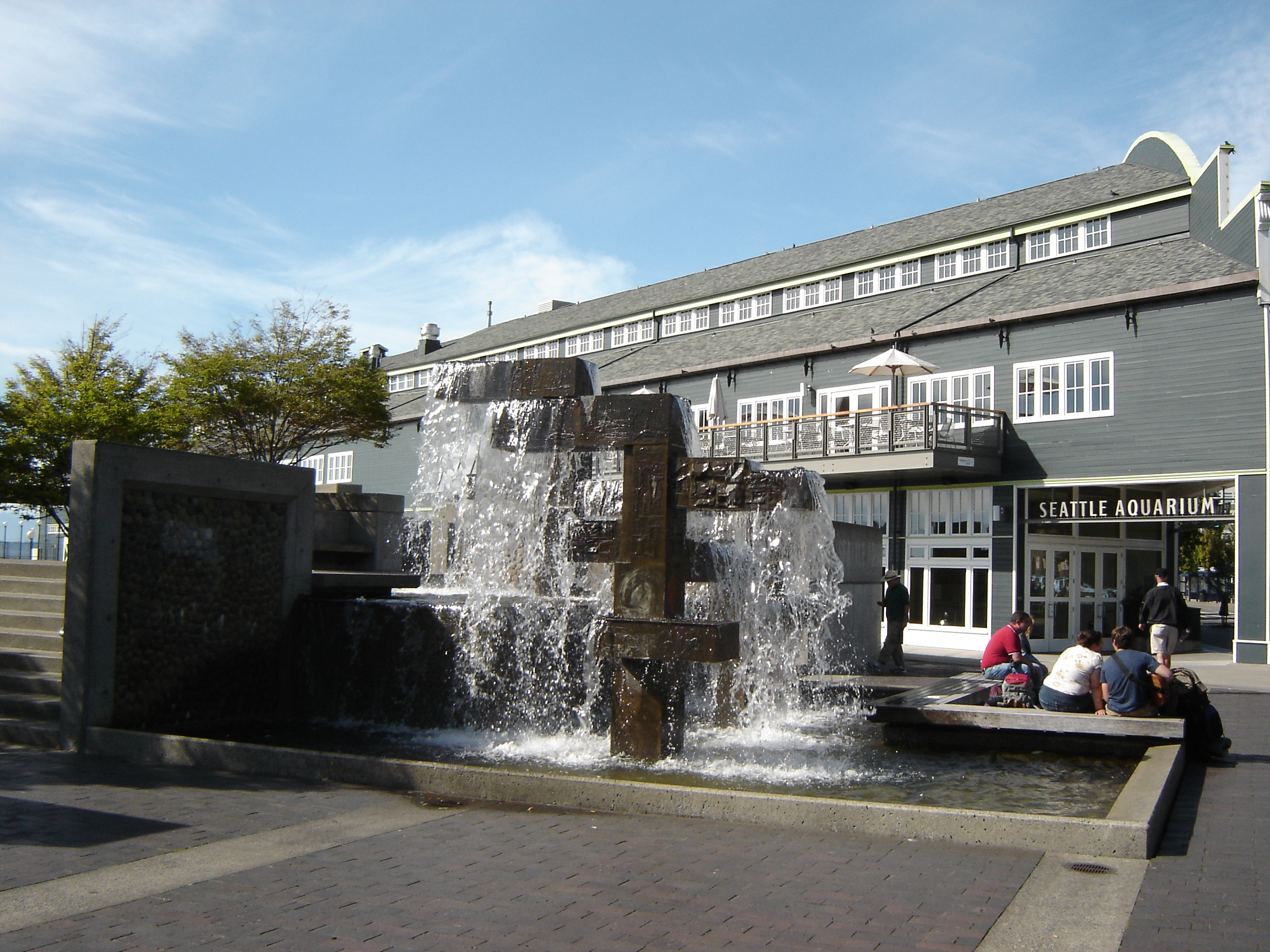
The fountain outside the Seattle Aquarium, 2009

Waterfront Fountain is an outdoor 1974 fountain and sculpture by James FitzGerald and Margaret Tomkins, installed along Alaskan Way in Seattle, in the U.S. state of Washington. The fountain is located near the Seattle Aquarium at Waterfront Park on Pier 58.

== History ==
FitzGerald created several fountains for parks around the Seattle area, including one at the Seattle Center for the Century 21 Exposition in 1962. He was commissioned to design a fountain for the new Waterfront Park, but died in 1973 before work was finalized. The project had been funded by a $75,000 donation from Helen Martha Schiff. Following his death in 1973, his widow Margaret Tomkins lead the effort to complete the fountain's design. It was completed alongside the park and adjacent to the aquarium in October 1974.

In 2019, construction began on a revamp of a portion of Seattle's waterfront. On September 13, 2020, the central portion of Pier 58 collapsed during early demolition work following the discovery of extensive structural issues. The structural integrity of the pier had been compromised by a combination of the environment and the supports for the fountain failing. The fountain, weighing 4 tons, fell into the water along with two contractors who were working on the demolition. Divers retrieved the fountain from the sea during the cleanup process.

A rebuilt Pier 58 with a restored Waterfront Fountain opened to the public on July 25, 2025. The fountain, now located at the southeast corner of the pier, received a new finish and new plumbing.

== See also ==
- 1974 in art
- Waterfront Park
