= Fountain of the Northwest =

Fountain and sculpture in Seattle, Washington, U.S.

- Part of the fountain in 2023
- Artist: James FitzGerald
- Location: Seattle, Washington, U.S.
- 47°37′27.4″N 122°21′8.7″W

Fountain of the Northwest is a 1961–1962 fountain and bronze sculpture by James FitzGerald, installed in Seattle Center's Cornish Playhouse Courtyard, in the U.S. state of Washington. The work measures 246 x 132 x 126 in. (624.8 x 335.3 x 320 cm).

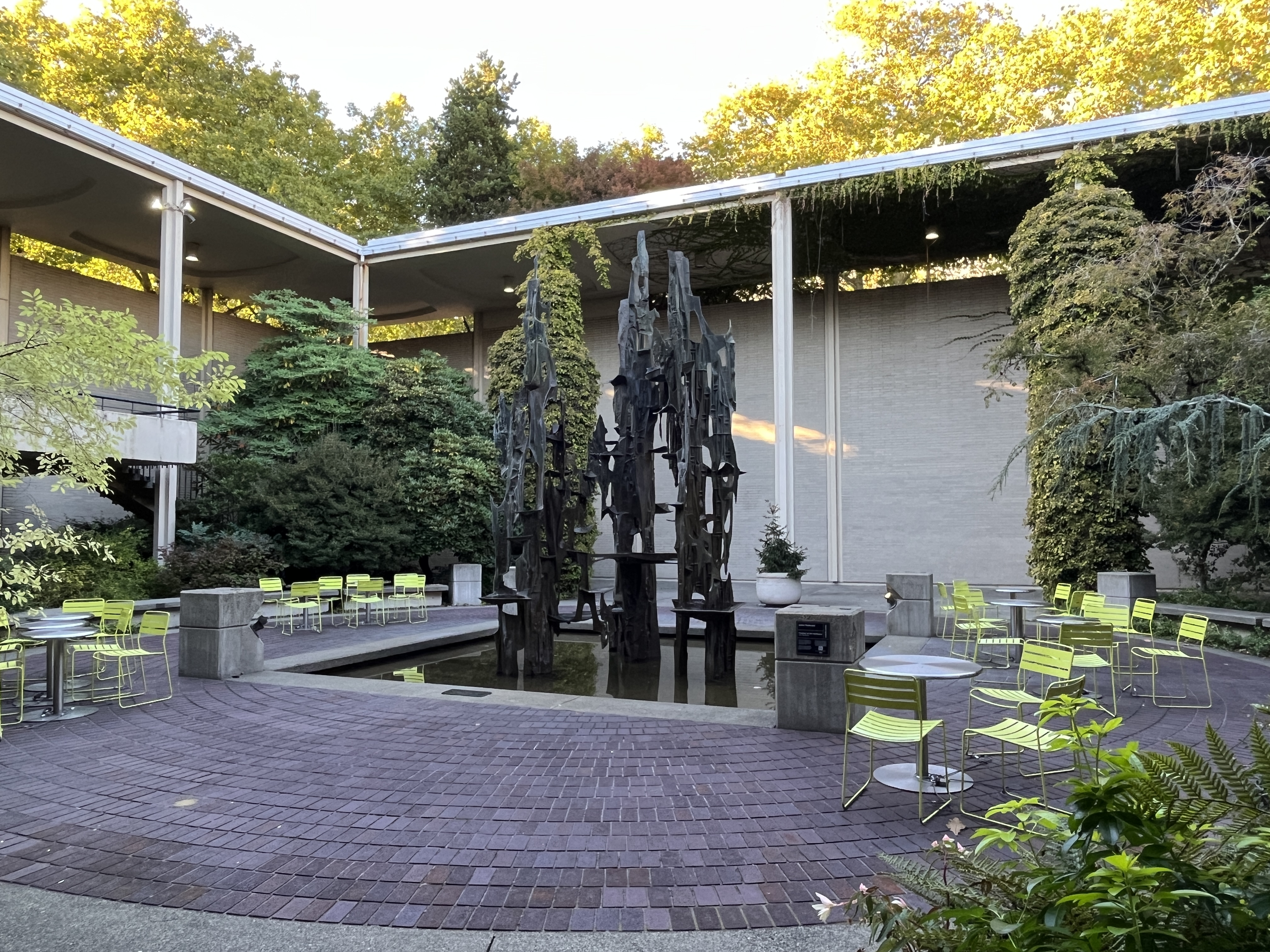
Cornish Playhouse Courtyard

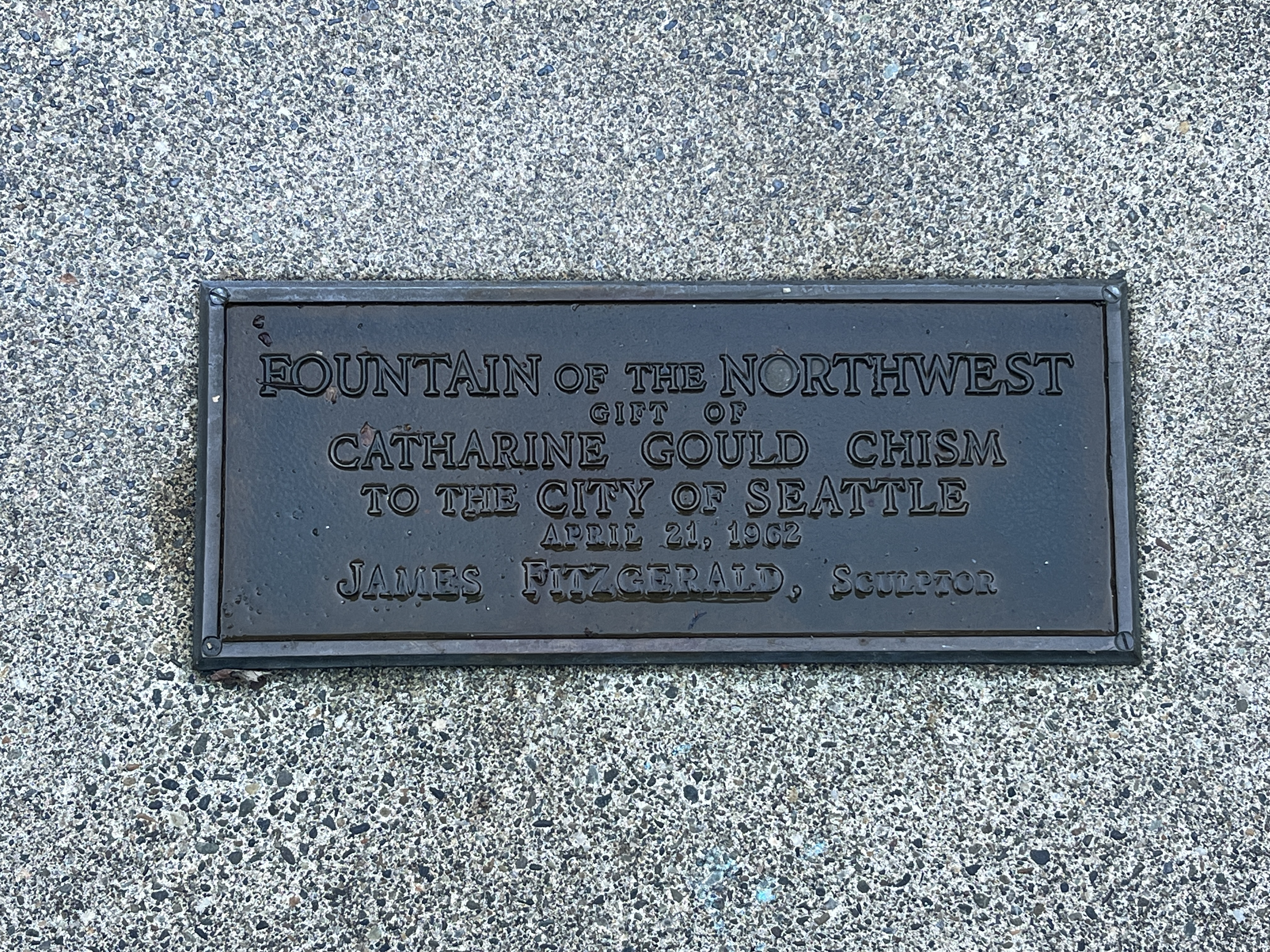
Plaque
