= Margaret Tomkins =

American painter

Margaret Tomkins. Date and photographer unknown.

Margaret Tomkins (1916–2002) was an American Surrealist / Abstract Expressionist painter. Though born, raised, and educated in Southern California, she spent most of her life in the Pacific Northwest, where she was well known both for her art and her energetic, outspoken art activism. Her Surrealist works of the 1940s earned considerable national attention, and as her work evolved in the 1950s and 1960s, she came to be known as a pioneer in Abstract Expressionism. Tomkins was the driving force behind the first artist-owned gallery in Seattle, Washington. Though friends with many of the artists of the Northwest School, she denied any artistic connection to these "mystic" painters, at times deriding their claims of quasi-magical inspiration from nature as "silly". She was similarly dismissive of any categorization based on her gender.

She was married to painter and sculptor James FitzGerald, who died in 1973. She spent most of the last thirty years of her life living in a rustic home-studio in the San Juan Islands. She continued painting until a few days before her death, maintaining a distinctive abstract style in various phases.

== Life and career ==
Tomkins was born on September 11, 1916, in Los Angeles, California, to Percival James and Margaret Quinn Tomkins. She had an older brother named Jack. Her father was in the paint manufacturing business and her mother was a gifted musician. After completing high school she attended the University of Southern California and, during summers, the Chouinard Art Institute. A memorable experience for the young artist was seeing Pablo Picasso's Guernica at the Stendahl Gallery in Los Angeles. She was an officer of the California Watercolor Society, but painted in oil as well. Her work was first seen nationally at the 1939 New York World's Fair's American Art Today exhibit, where she displayed a Regionalist-style landscape in watercolor.

Tomkins relocated to Seattle, Washington, in 1939, becoming an assistant professor of art at the University of Washington for a brief period. In 1940, she married Seattle artist James H. FitzGerald (1910–1973) who would also become a leading painter and sculptor in the Northwest. In 1941, she had her first solo exhibition at the Seattle Art Museum. The same year, Tomkins became involved in the Federal Art Project, teaching at the Spokane Art Center, one of the leading WPA facilities in the country, after her husband was appointed director of the center by Washington FAP head Bruce Inverarity. In 1942 Tomkins and Fitzgerald returned to Seattle, moving back into a house in the Capitol Hill neighborhood which they had purchased and begun renovating in 1939.

Night Bondage, Margaret Tomkins, 1945.

During the Second World War, while FitzGerald worked at Boeing, Tomkins gave birth to the first of their three children. She supplemented their income with ceramic works, and began working with egg tempera while sketching out new directions for her painting. In addition to painting, Tomkins and FitzGerald were both fine craftsmen and sculptors, working in ceramics and even furniture design. Their Modernist ceramics were mostly utilitarian objects such as bowls, vessels and lamps, done in a unique and imaginative style. Works by Tomkins appeared in several annual shows at the Whitney in New York and the Corcoran Gallery in Washington, D.C., and in 1947 three of her pieces were selected for inclusion in the Abstract and Surrealist American Art exhibit at the Chicago Art Institute. That same year, a one-person show of twenty-three of her paintings was mounted at the Palace of the Legion of Honor in San Francisco alongside a solo exhibition of prints by surrealist artist Roderick Mead; these works were also shown at the Seattle Art Museum. At this time, with only a handful of small galleries (such as Zoe Dusanne's and Otto Seligman's) showing modern art in Seattle, Tomkins was looking beyond the confines of the Northwest for both inspiration and reaction.

Two of Tomkins' submissions for the Northwest Annuals were purchased by SAM in the 1940s, before her anger over the museum's relationship with the group of artists who would become known as the Northwest School led her to boycott the Annuals. Paintings such as Metamorphosis (1943) and Anamorphosis (1944) show how completely she had moved beyond the Regionalism of her California Watercolor Society days. Tomkin's surrealistic biomorphism of the 1940s transferred creative internal energies into organic, visceral abstractions based on natural forms, a direction she continued to explore through the 1950s. The influence of European Surrealists such as Salvador Dalí is evident, and - despite her problems with the politics and pretensions of the Northwest School - so is the influence of Morris Graves and other Northwest painters.

In 1948 Tomkins and FitzGerald purchased several acres of land on Lopez, in the San Juan Islands, on which the family began constructing a summer home/studio using mostly natural, found, and recycled materials.

In 1958, Tomkins became the driving force behind the Artists Gallery, the first gallery in Seattle to be owned by the artists themselves. The co-op of Tomkins, FitzGerald, Louis Bunce, William Ivey, Manuel Izquierdo, and Alden Mason managed to keep the gallery at 1705 E. Olive Way going for about a year.

In 1959, a devastating fire at their Capitol Hill studio destroyed the majority of the works Tomkins and FitzGerald had produced up until that time. Tomkins was in California at the time of the fire, tending to her ailing mother, who died three weeks later.

In the 1960s Tomkins, having shifted from tempera to oil painting, created the pure Abstract style for which she remains best-known today. Transformation and metamorphosis were common themes, with forms shape-shifting across her canvases, twisting and intertwining with or obscuring each other. She generally used a limited palette of grays, whites, and earth tones, with occasional flashes of red, blue, and yellow, developing an intricate symbolic language to express social and environmental concerns or reflect on personal experiences.

She returned to the University of Washington as a guest professor in 1962, and again in 1972.

Autumn, Margaret Tomkins, 1963.

In 1973 FitzGerald died of bone cancer, and Tomkins took on the job of completing a 6,000-pound, 11-foot-high bronze fountain her husband had been commissioned to build. She saw the piece, called Waterfront Fountain, through to completion and installation at Seattle's Waterfront Park.

After FitzGerald's death Tomkins stopped exhibiting her work regularly, but continued painting, developing a more geometric, pastel-toned style. She spent most of the last thirty years of her life at her home on Lopez Island. In 1988 she suffered a stroke, which left her unable to speak. Her last large exhibition was held at Seattle's Foster/White Gallery in 1993. In 2002 her daughter Miro FitzGerald-Watson had her moved to a care facility near Miro and her husband's home in Sedona, Arizona; in March 2002, Margaret Tomkins died at age 85.

== Legacy ==
Margaret Tomkins' work has been included in exhibitions at the Metropolitan Museum of Art, New York; the Museum of Modern Art, San Francisco; the Whitney Museum of American Art, New York; the Art Institute of Chicago; the Corcoran Gallery, Washington, D.C.; the Seattle Art Museum; the Portland Art Museum; the Tacoma Art Museum; the Bellevue Arts Museum; the Henry Art Gallery; the Frye Art Museum; Washington State University; Evergreen State College; the Whatcom Museum; and many other museums and galleries.
