= Ruth Egri =

American painter

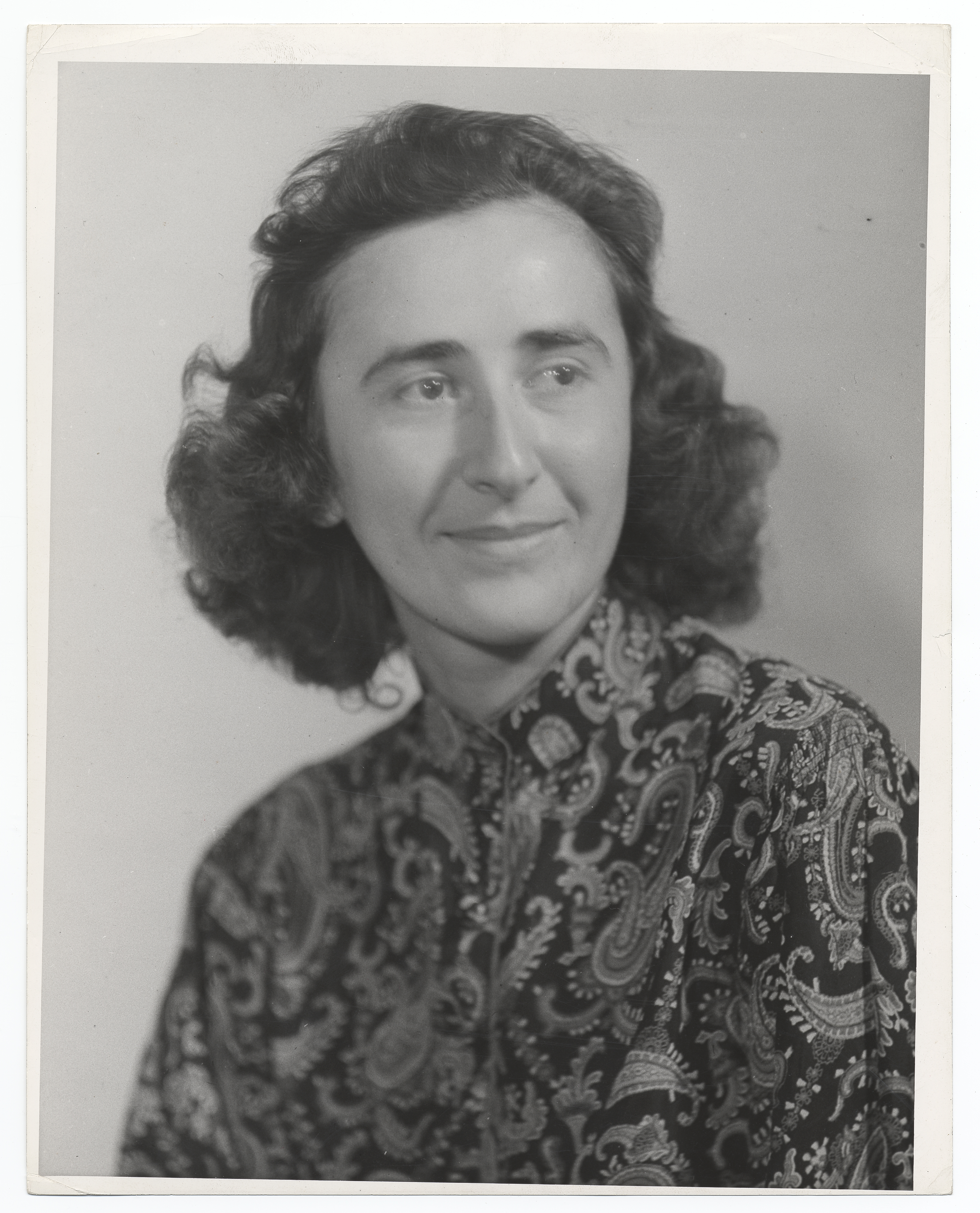
- Ruth Egri, photographed for the Works Progress Administration, New York, NY. From the collection of the Archives of American Art.
- Born: 1911
- Died: 1996 January 14, 1996; Aurora, Colorado
- Known for: Figure painter, muralist, illustrator

Ruth Egri (1911–1996) was an American artist, painter, muralist, educator, and illustrator of Hungarian-Jewish descent who worked in the Federal Art Project and in the WPA New Reading Materials Program during the New Deal. She is known for her mural at Lincoln Hospital (Bronx, New York), and for teaching mural painting at the Spokane Art Center, Washington.

== Education ==
Egri studied at the National Academy of Design, the Art Students League of New York, and the Master Institute of the Roerich Museum with Howard Giles.

== Family ==
Egri's parents were Ilona and playwright Lajos Egri and she had multiple brothers. She painted and exhibited in Taos, NM with one of her brothers, Ted Egri.

== Career ==
On top of all her art projects, Egri was also an educator who taught courses at the Spokane Art Center in Washington and the WPA's New Reading Materials Program, sponsored by the NYC Board of Education. Egri was most interested in making art that primarily expressed the female figure.

== Works ==
Egri's art works that have been discovered upon her death include:

- 2 sketchbooks
- 14 loose sketches
- 21 drawings
- 13 watercolors

She also painted an exhibit in Taos, New Mexico with her brother Ted Egri.

== Appearances ==
Her illustrations appeared in three children's books.
