= Spokane Art Center =

The Spokane Art Center in Spokane, Washington, was a community art school opened in 1938 as part of the Works Progress Administration's (WPA) Federal Art Project during the Great Depression. Its staff included many notable artists, and it was widely considered to be one of the nation's most successful FAP art centers. It closed in 1942.

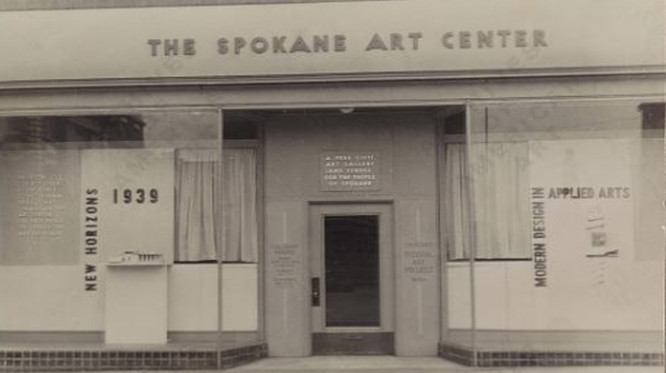
Spokane Art Center, front entrance, 1939. Photographer unknown. Archives of American Art/Smithsonian Institution.

== Background ==
The Federal Art Project was headed by Holger Cahill from its inception in 1935 to its end in 1943. In addition to supporting impoverished artists, and producing artwork for federal government use, Cahill saw the FAP's mission as maintaining the health of American art generally; to this end, support was given to the creation of community art centers, aimed at providing instruction and education for adults and children, as well as gallery space for local and touring WPA/FAP art exhibitions. Working closely with local officials and arts organizations, regional and state FAP directors located areas where interest and support were strong. Once a municipality was able to provide a location and seed money, FAP would provide three to four times the amount in matching funds, as well as teachers, directors, and other staff. The first center opened in Winston-Salem, North Carolina, in 1935. Open to all, free of charge, with no race restrictions, the centers proved tremendously popular – despite complaints from some Congressmen and editorialists that they were frivolous and wasteful expenditures. Eventually, 103 FAP art centers were established across the nation, in all 48 states, along with many similar, locally-funded programs.

== History ==
The Spokane Art Center was the fiftieth free community art school established under the Federal Art Project. It came about as the result of meetings between Washington State FAP director R. Bruce Inverarity and members of the Spokane Arts Association (many of whom subsequently became SAC Board members). Despite his ardent opposition to President Franklin D. Roosevelt and his New Deal programs, local newspaperman and business magnate William H. Cowles donated the use of a spacious, three-storey building, while a fund-drive by Parent-Teacher Associations, businesses, and arts associations produced more-than-adequate startup money, gaining $12,000 in federal funds.

The center officially opened on September 29, 1938, under the directorship of Carl Morris, a Californian who had been hired by Inverarity. The teaching staff included, at various times, artists Robert Engard, Guy Anderson, Clyfford Still, Hilda Grossman, Z. Vanessa Helder, Joseph Solman, Margaret Tomkins, James FitzGerald, Kenneth Downer, and Ruth Egri. FitzGerald eventually took over from Morris as the center's director.

Centrally located at North 106 Monroe Street in downtown Spokane, the center attracted several hundred enrollees for adult and children's classes in painting, drawing, sculpture, printmaking, metalwork, and ceramics. Lectures on art history were well-attended, and thousands of people viewed exhibitions presented in the Center's gallery. Despite these successes, avant garde-minded staffers at times butted heads with more conservative Spokanites, and Inverarity's plan to open more community art centers statewide raised considerable ire among the Spokane Art Center's backers, who saw it as a diversion of already sparse resources. These controversies, however, were soon overshadowed by changing wartime priorities, and the Center was shut down in November 1942.

In 1952 the name and the basic concept of the Spokane Art Center were revived, in a new location, under the aegis of Washington State University; in 1963 it became the Corbin House Arts and Crafts Center, and in 1970 the Corbin Art Center, operated by Spokane's department of Parks and Recreation.
