= Women Painters of Washington =

The Women Painters of Washington is a non-profit organization based in the U.S. state of Washington. The group was formed on October 6, 1930, by six female artists who met while attending a portrait class sponsored by the Art Institute of Seattle, which was a predecessor to the Seattle Art Museum. The women joined in order to overcome the limitations they faced as female artists and to stimulate their artistic growth through fellowship. Founding members were Elizabeth Warhanik, Dorothy Dolph Jensen, Lily Norling Hardwick, Myra Albert Wiggins, Anne Belle Stone, and Helen Bebb. Originally called the Women Artists of Washington, their first exhibition was held at the Women's Century Club on Seattle's Capitol Hill. Subsequent annual exhibitions were usually held at the Frederick & Nelson department store in downtown Seattle. In 1936 the name was changed to Women Painters of Washington.

Other notable members of the group include Doris Totten Chase, Z. Vanessa Helder, Ebba Rapp, and Yvonne Twining Humber.

The group continues to meet at the Seattle Art Museum.

== Selected exhibitions ==
Year	Title	Location	Notes
1931	"Women Artists of Washington"	Women's Century Club (Roy Street), Seattle, WA	First publicly-held exhibit from May 8–16 by the organization.
1931	"Women Artists of Washington"	Bon Marche building, 4th floor, Seattle, WA	Public exhibit. Six painting by WAW member Mrs. Orville Allen included in November group show.
1932	"Women Artists of Washington"	Seattle Civic Auditorium	Mrs. E.L. Hiberly, chairperson of arts for the state and biennial conventions arranged for the WAW exhibit in November.
1932	"Women Artists of Washington: Second Annual Exhibit"	Northwest galleries, 1250 Fifth Ave., Seattle	Mrs. Elizabeth Warhanik, WAW President. Sixty paintings were included.
1933	"Women Artists of Washington: Annual Exhibit"	"new Seattle Art Museum in Volunteer Park	The exhibit included sketches and oil and watercolor paintings by 36 member artists. The exhibit was opened for a month.
