= Kerry Park =

Park in Seattle, Washington, U.S.

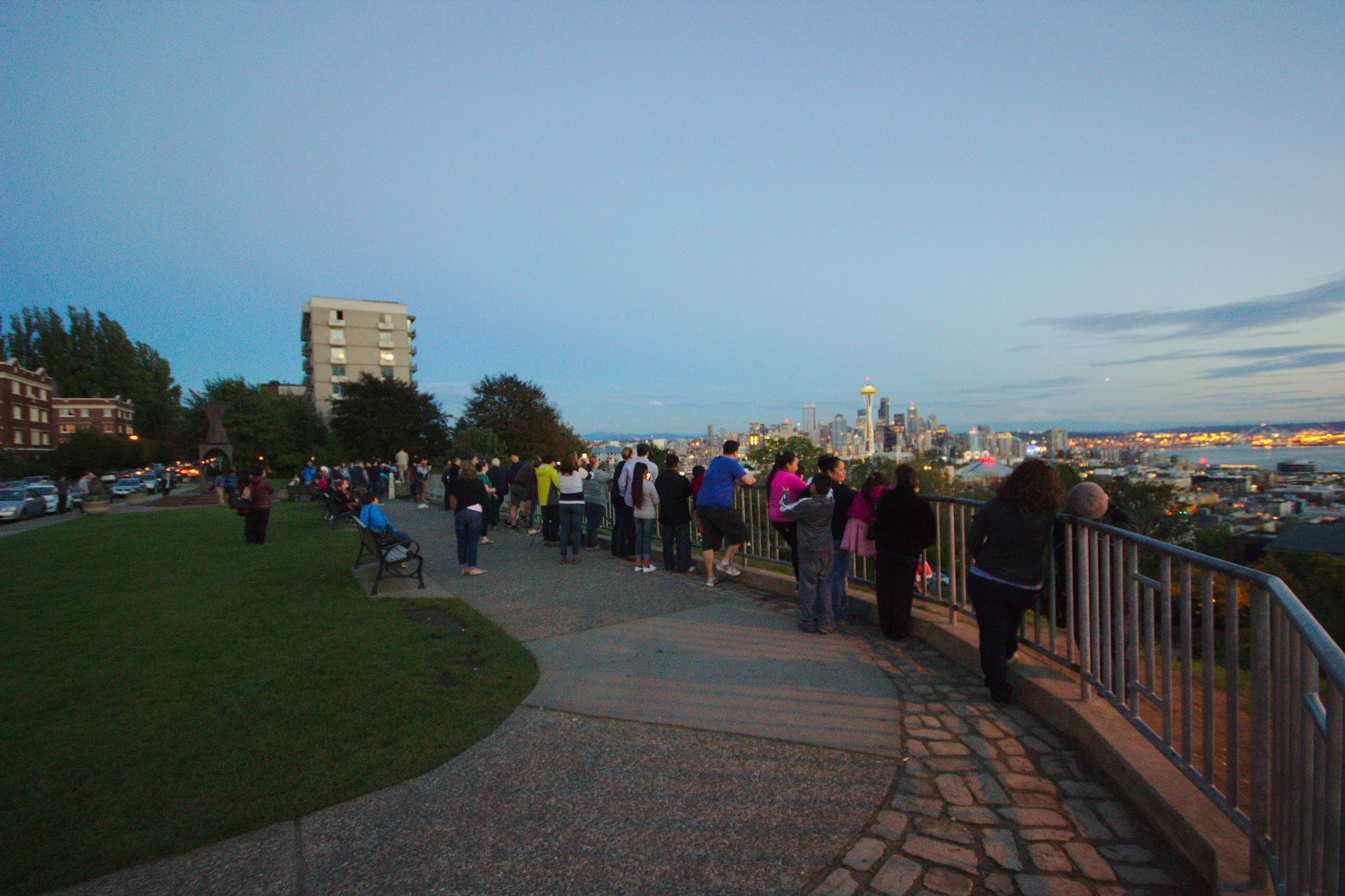
- On clear evenings, Kerry Park is often crowded with people taking photos of the Seattle skyline.
- Interactive map of Kerry Park
- Type: Urban Park
- Location: Seattle, Washington
- Coordinates: 47°37′46″N 122°21′36″W
- Area: 1.26 acres (0.51 ha)
- Created: 1927; 99 years ago
- Operator: Seattle Parks and Recreation
- Website: seattle.gov/kerry-park

Kerry Park is a small public park and viewpoint on the south slope of Queen Anne Hill in Seattle, Washington, United States. It overlooks Downtown Seattle and is located along West Highland Drive between 2nd Avenue West and 3rd Avenue West. The park's view is considered to offer the most iconic views of the city skyline, with the Space Needle prominent at the center, Elliott Bay to the west, and Mount Rainier in the background.

== Description and history ==
The park encompasses 1.26 acres (0.51 ha) and includes a railing and several benches facing south towards the skyline. A stairway on the west end of the park connects below to West Prospect Street and the Bayview-Kinnear Park, which has a small playground. Kerry Park is named after the couple lumberman and business magnate Albert S. Kerry and his wife Katharine. They lived nearby, and donated the land to the city in 1927 "so that all who stop here may enjoy [its] view."

At the center of Kerry Park is Changing Form, a steel sculpture by artist Doris Totten Chase that stands 15 feet (4.6 m) high and was installed in 1971 with donations from Kerry's children. The sculpture is hollow and is popular as a play area for children and as a framing device for photographers. That view from Kerry Park encompasses downtown Seattle, Elliott Bay, the West Seattle peninsula, Bainbridge Island, and Mount Rainier.

The view from the park is often used as the backdrop for television news segments on Seattle, as well as other media depictions of the city. Kerry Park was also featured in the opening credits of the 1999 film 10 Things I Hate About You, and in Frasier as the view from the titular character's apartment.
