= Changing Form =

Steel sculpture in Seattle, Washington, U.S.

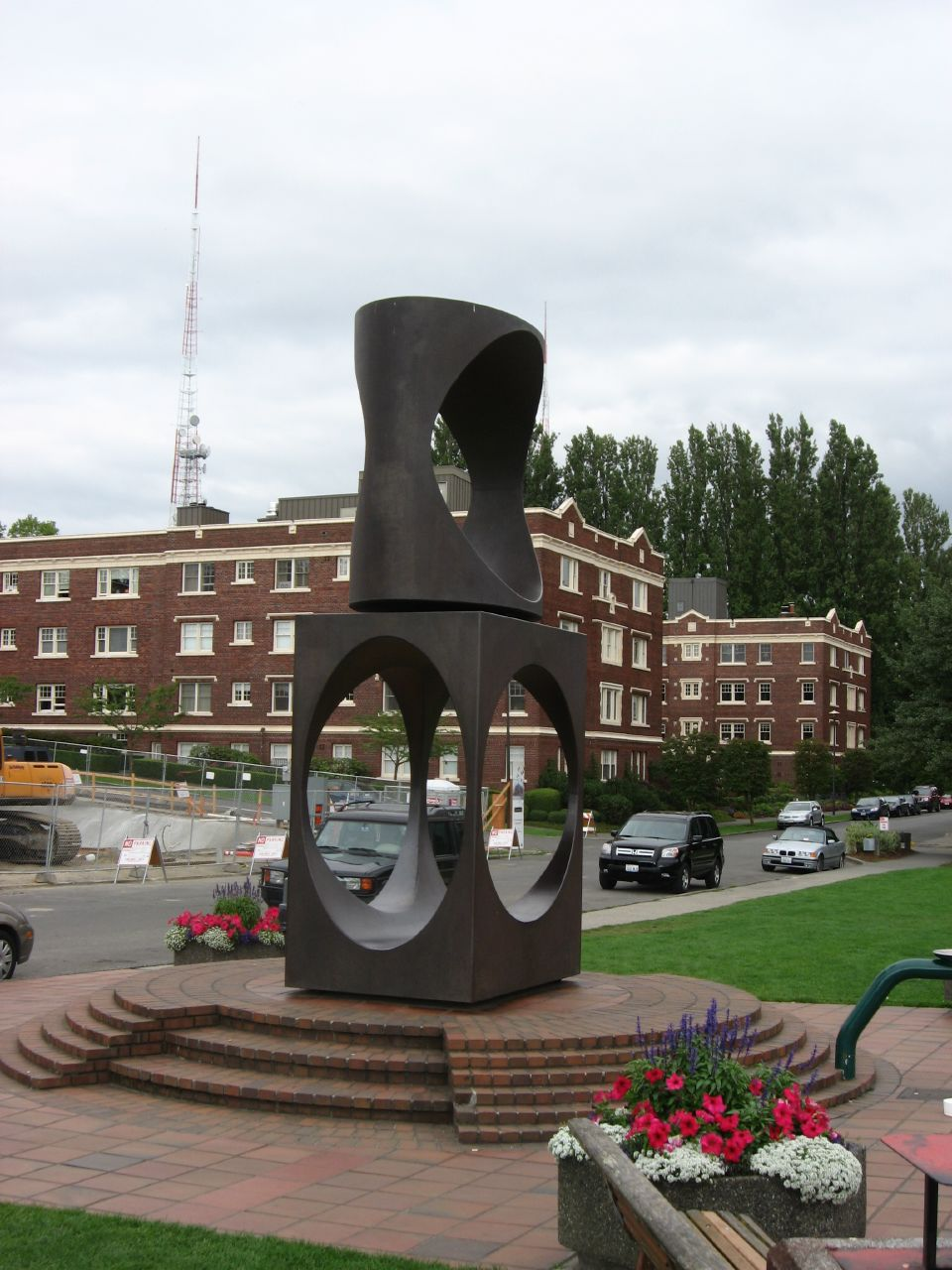
- Artist: Doris Totten Chase
- Medium: Steel sculpture
- Location: Seattle, Washington, U.S.; 47.629497°N 122.359922°W

Changing Form (also known as Kinetic and Volumetric Space Frame) is an abstract steel sculpture by artist Doris Totten Chase, installed in the center of Seattle's Kerry Park, in the U.S. state of Washington. The sculpture was given by Mr. and Mrs. Kerry's three children, and stands 4.6 meters (15 ft) tall. Since installation in 1971, the sculpture has been popular among photographers using it to frame the Seattle skyline or Mt Rainier, and children crawling around its smooth, black curves.
