= Anne Belle Stone =

American artist

- Born: 1874; Des Moines, Iowa
- Died: 1949 (aged 74–75); Seattle, Washington
- Known for: Painting
- Movement: American Impressionism

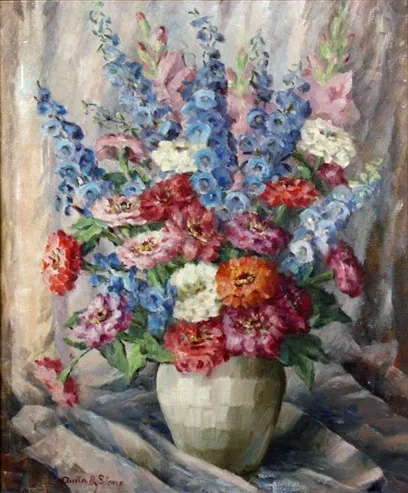
Untitled, circa 1940

Anne Belle Stone or Anna Belle Stone (1874–1949) was an American artist known for her floral still-lifes. She was one of the founders of the Women Painters of Washington.

== Biography ==
Stone was born in 1874 in Des Moines, Iowa, and moved to Seattle, Washington, in 1889. She studied at the University of Washington and Scripps College. In 1930 she helped found the Women Painters of Washington. She was also a member of the National League of American Pen Women and the Northwest Watercolor Society.

She exhibited primarily on the West Coast. From 1931 through 1950 she exhibited her work at the Western Washington Fair. Stone also exhibited works at the California Palace of the Legion of Honor, the Henry Art Gallery, the Oakland Art Gallery, the Portland Art Museum, and the Seattle Art Museum Her work has been characterized as American Impressionist.

Stone died in 1949 in Seattle, Washington.
