= Doris Totten Chase =

American artist (1923–2008)

- Born: Doris Mae Totten; April 29, 1923; Seattle, Washington, U.S.
- Died: December 13, 2008 (aged 85); Seattle, Washington
- Spouse: Elmo Chase (m. 1943–1971)

Doris Totten Chase (29 April 1923 – 13 December 2008) was an American painter, teacher, and sculptor. She was a member of the Northwest School. Chase had a career as a painter and sculptor before moving to New York, where she made video art.

== Early life and education ==
Chase was born Doris Mae Totten and graduated from Roosevelt High School in 1941. From 1941 to 1943, she studied architecture at the University of Washington before dropping out of college in 1943 to marry Elmo Chase, a lieutenant in the U.S. Navy.

== Art career ==
To support her family, which had grown to two children, Chase taught painting and design at Edison Technical School. Chase was accepted into Women Painters of Washington in 1951. She remained a member until the mid-1960s.

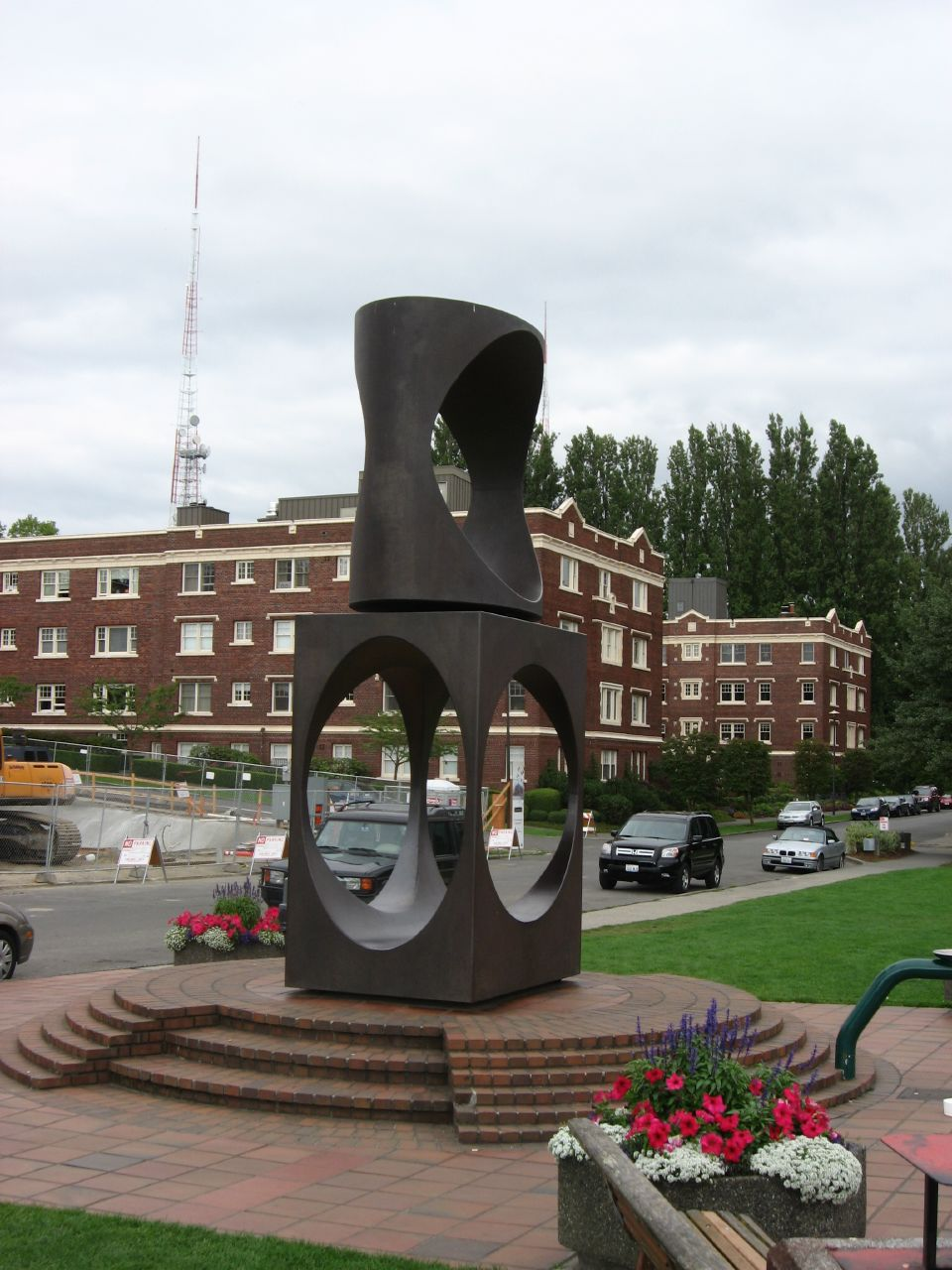
Changing Form sculpture in Seattle's Kerry Park

An early steel sculpture, the 4.6 m (15 ft) tall Changing Form, was commissioned for Kerry Park on Queen Anne Hill, in 1971.

In 1972, she moved to New York. She began creating video art, using computer imaging when video art was new. Chase was encouraged by the video artist, Nam June Paik, to explore video art and during 1973 to 1974, she participated in the Experimental Television Center’s Residency Program. (Note: Doris Chase's artworks can be found in the Experimental Television Center Archive, in the Rose Goldsen Archive of New Media Art, Cornell University Library.)

She began by integrating her sculptures with interactive dancers, using special effects to create dreamlike work. Victor Ancona said of Chase's dance videos, "Watching her tapes gave me the feeling of being transported to an enchanted, phosphorescent environment unceasingly in flux, a voyage I will long remember".

Chase's most widely shown work is a series of 30-minute video dramas regarding older women's autonomy, titled By Herself. Table for One (1985), stars Geraldine Page in a voice-over monologue of a woman uneasy about dining alone, followed by Dear Papa (1986), starring Anne Jackson and her daughter Roberta Wallach. The third video was A Dancer (1987). Still Frame (1988) featured Priscilla Pointer and Robert Symonds. Sophie (1989) featured Joan Plowright as a woman who has just left her philandering husband to become "Sophie, reader of French tarot cards". The first two videos were presented at the Berlin and London Film Festivals in 1985 and 1986. Dear Papa won First Prize at Paris' 1986 Women's International Film Festival.

== Later life ==
In 1993, Chase produced a video documentary about her home, the Chelsea Hotel. The Chelsea Hotel was originally conceived as New York's first major cooperative apartment house, owned by a consortium of wealthy families in 1883, becoming a hotel in 1905. Chase's video paid tribute to the building's 110th anniversary, and those who have called it home. In 1999, her four-piece bronze sculpture Moon Gates, 17 feet high, was installed at Seattle Center. The Seattle Art Museum has only one Chase work in its collection: a 1950s oil painting. Documents relating to the production of her video works are held in The Celeste Bartos International Film Study Center at the Museum of Modern Art, New York.

== Death and legacy ==
She died in 2008 from a combination of Alzheimer's disease and a series of strokes.

Her works are held in the collections of the Seattle Art Museum, Smithsonian American Art Museum, and the Henry Art Gallery, Seattle.

== Filmography ==
- Dear Papa (1986), cinematographer, director, writer
- Sophie (1990), cinematographer, director, writer
- Still Frame (1988), cinematographer, director, writer

=== Video ===
- Glass Curtain (1990), cinematographer, director, writer

=== Television ===
- A Dancer (1988) (TV), writer
