= Seattle Aquarium =

Aquarium in Seattle, Washington, United States

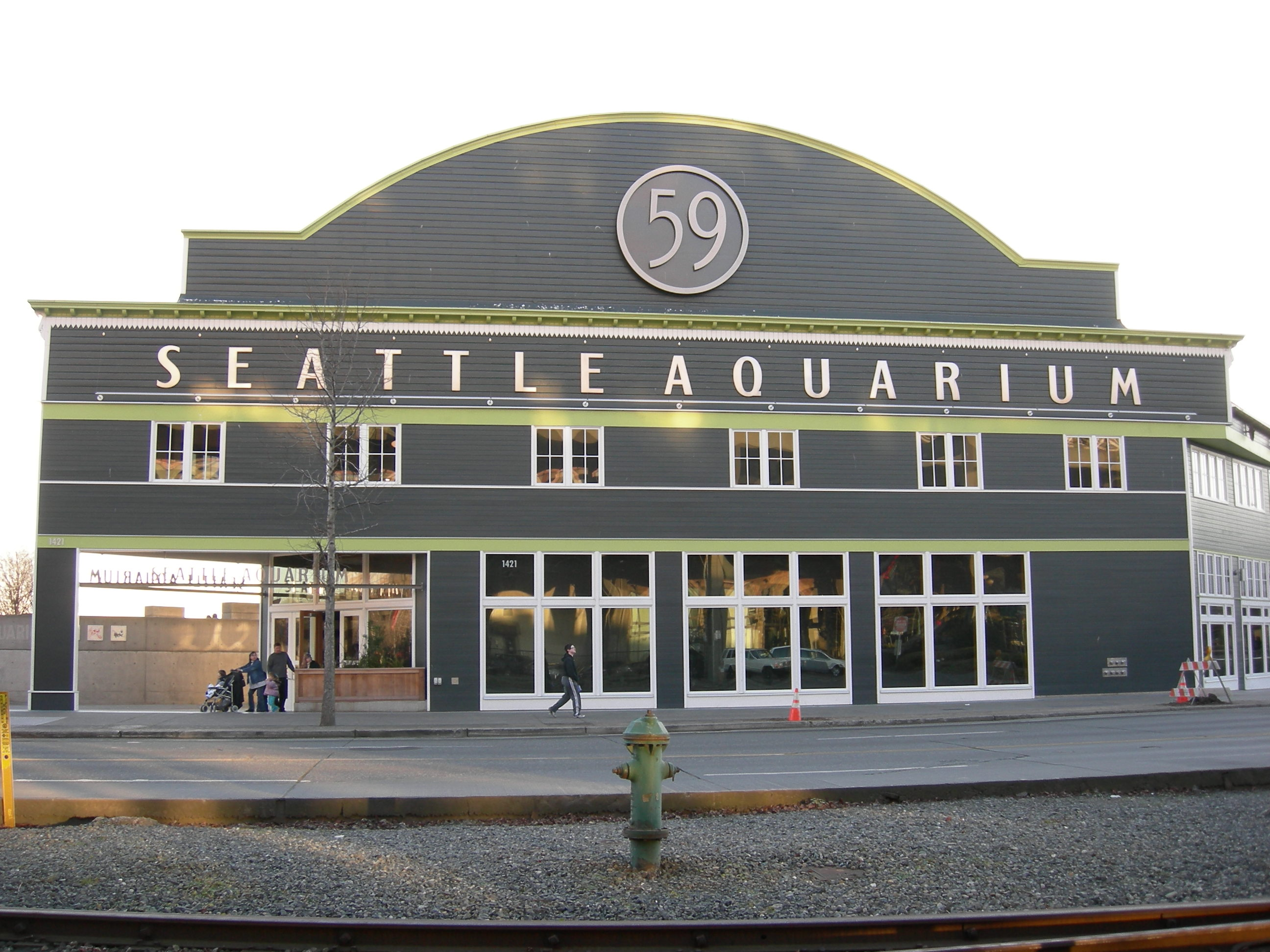
- Entrance at Pier 59, the building has city landmark status.
- Interactive map of Seattle Aquarium
- 47°36′27″N 122°20′35″W
- Date opened: May 20, 1977
- Location: Pier 59; Seattle, Washington, U.S.
- Volume of largest tank: 475,000 US gal (1,800,000 L)
- Annual visitors: 850,000
- Memberships: AZA
- Website: www.seattleaquarium.org

The Seattle Aquarium is a public aquarium in Seattle, Washington, United States, located on Pier 59 and 60 on the Elliott Bay waterfront. The aquarium opened in 1977 and is accredited by the Association of Zoos and Aquariums (AZA).

The aquarium consists of three buildings. Its original buildings at Pier 59 and Pier 60 have six major exhibits. A third building, named the Ocean Pavilion, opened in August 2024 and focuses on the ecosystem of the Coral Triangle. This aquarium consistently participates in educational and conservation programs.

== History ==
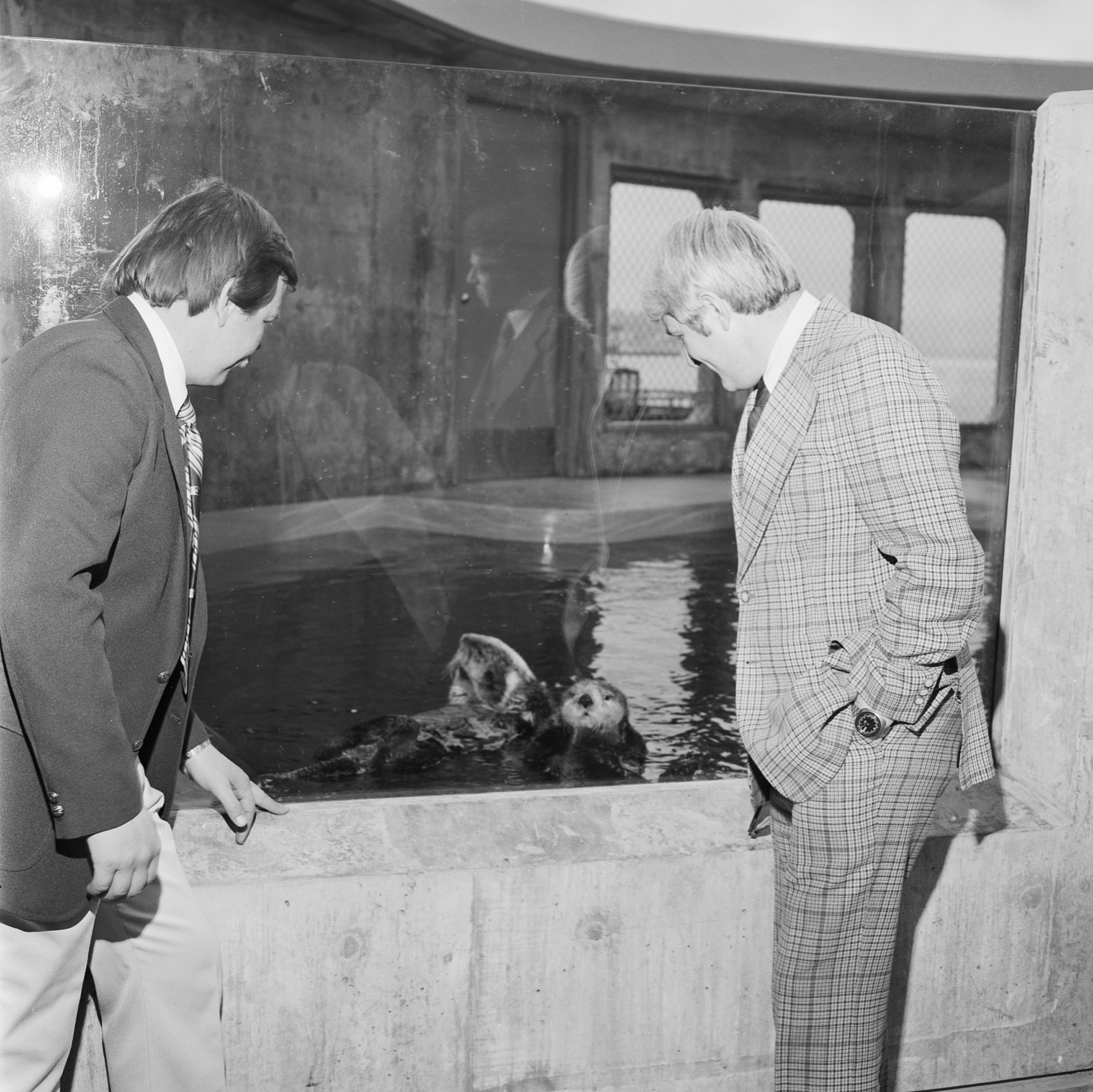
Seattle mayor Wes Uhlman (right) with otters at aquarium opening, 1977.

Plans for a city aquarium, replacing an existing private aquarium, were approved by voters in a 1968 Forward Thrust ballot initiative. The Seattle City Council approved a site near Golden Gardens Park in Ballard in April 1971, but reversed its decision months later following public outcry. A site on the north side of Pier 59 was instead chosen the following year, necessitating the demolition of additional piers, and was originally expected to begin construction in 1974 but was delayed by design revisions. The new aquarium was part of a large redevelopment program for the Alaskan Way promenade, which also included Waterfront Park and viewpoints.

Construction began in early 1975 with the driving of piles into the seabed to support the future aquarium structure. The aquarium opened on May 20, 1977, and attracted 1,524 visitors on its first day. It cost $5.4 million to construct and was initially owned and operated by the City of Seattle's Department of Parks and Recreation. The opening ceremonies included the release of salmon fingerlings into Elliott Bay and a three-day festival on the waterfront. Bassetti/Norton/Metler/Rekevics were the architects for the building; the exhibits were designed in consultation with local scientists, including Pacific Science Center director and later governor Dixy Lee Ray.

The aquarium's first expansion was announced in 1979 and was followed by a new exhibit in 1986. A $25.4 million expansion was rejected by Seattle voters in 1988 after failing to reach a needed supermajority. On June 22, 2007, an 18,000-square-foot (1,700 m^{2}) expansion added a 2,625-square-foot (243.9 m^{2}) gift store and café to the aquarium, as well as two new exhibits: Window on Washington Waters and Crashing Waves. The nonprofit Seattle Aquarium Society—the official 501(c)(3) nonprofit organization for the aquarium—assumed management of the institution from the city on July 1, 2010. The organization signed a 20-year operating agreement with the city government. The aquarium promotes marine conservation and educates over 800,000 visitors each year (including 50,000 students) on the impact of mankind on marine life. It also conducts research in these fields.

=== Ocean Pavilion expansion ===
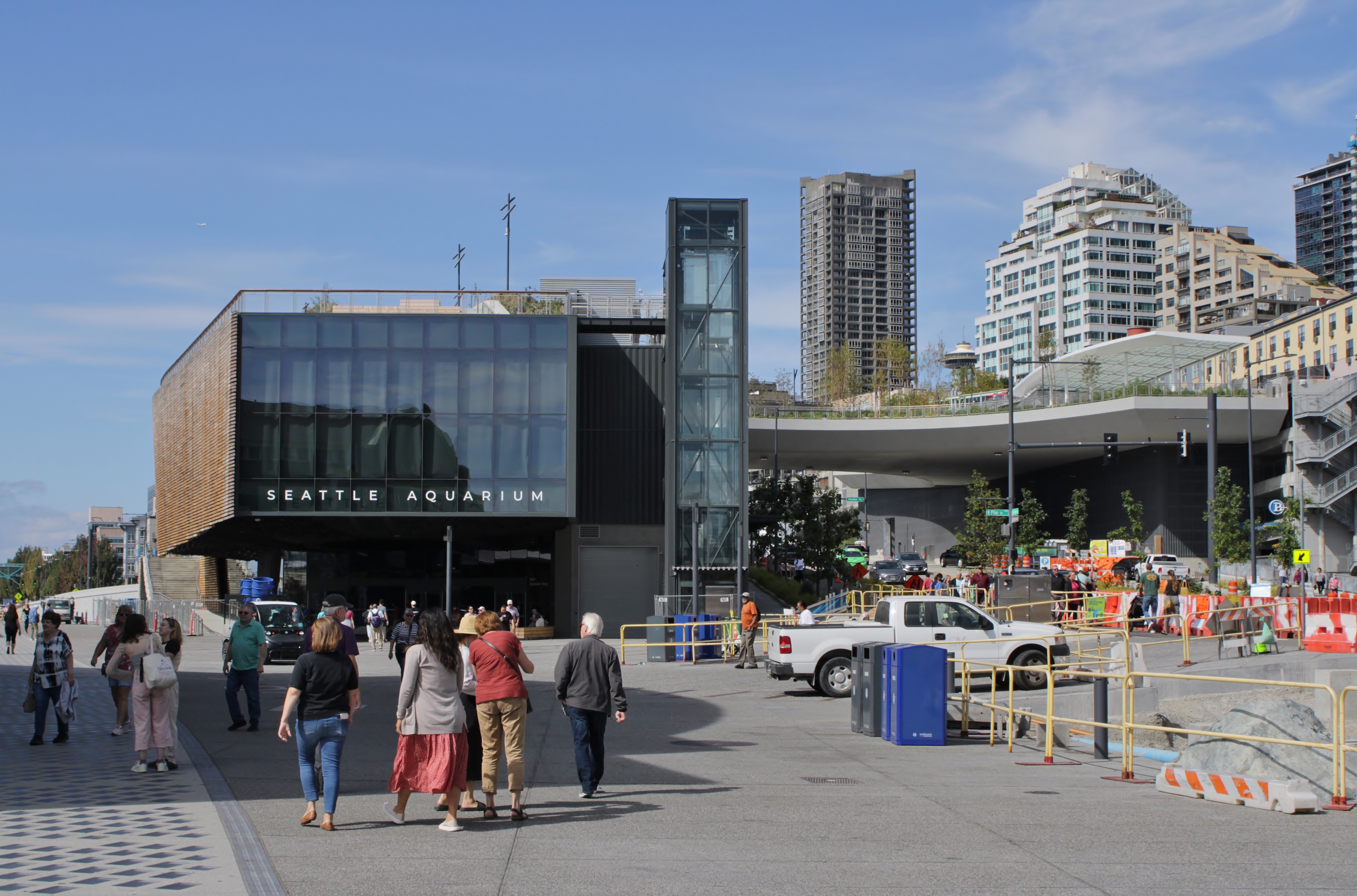
Exterior of the Ocean Pavilion

The Aquarium Society began planning for a major expansion in 2015 to coincide with the redevelopment of Alaskan Way and the Seattle waterfront following the forthcoming removal of the Alaskan Way Viaduct. The expansion, named the Ocean Pavilion, was announced in 2019 and is centered around a 50,000-square-foot (4,600 m^{2}) exhibit building. The project includes a new waterfront promenade, which includes an overpass to Pike Place Market, and a 325,000-US-gallon (1,230,000 L) tank for sharks and stingrays. The Ocean Pavilion opened on August 29, 2024, and focused on the tropical Coral Triangle region of the Pacific Ocean near Indonesia. The building was designed by LMN Architects and uses a yellow cedar exterior that mimics driftwood. The facility was modified to add sustainable features, including the ability to recirculate 96% of its saltwater and manage the temperature of its tanks with a heat exchanger and heat pump. The building is also LEED gold certified. The outside of the building an inside of its entryway feature artwork by Lummi artist Dan Friday.

==== Funding ====
The city government initially approved $34 million in funding from a real estate excise tax but also contributed a $20 million loan in 2022 to fill an expected shortfall, stemming in part from an increase from the original $113 million estimate. The project was expected to cost $160 million with the majority of funds coming from local taxes, private donations, and other sources. An additional loan of $67 million from PNC Bank was requested by operator Seattle Aquarium Society in 2023 to complete the project. It would require city approval to extend the society's contract to 2040 and assume responsibility to pay a termination fee for the loan.

== Exhibits ==
The aquarium's exhibits are located in three buildings; Pier 59, Pier 60, and the Ocean Pavilion.

=== Pier 59 ===
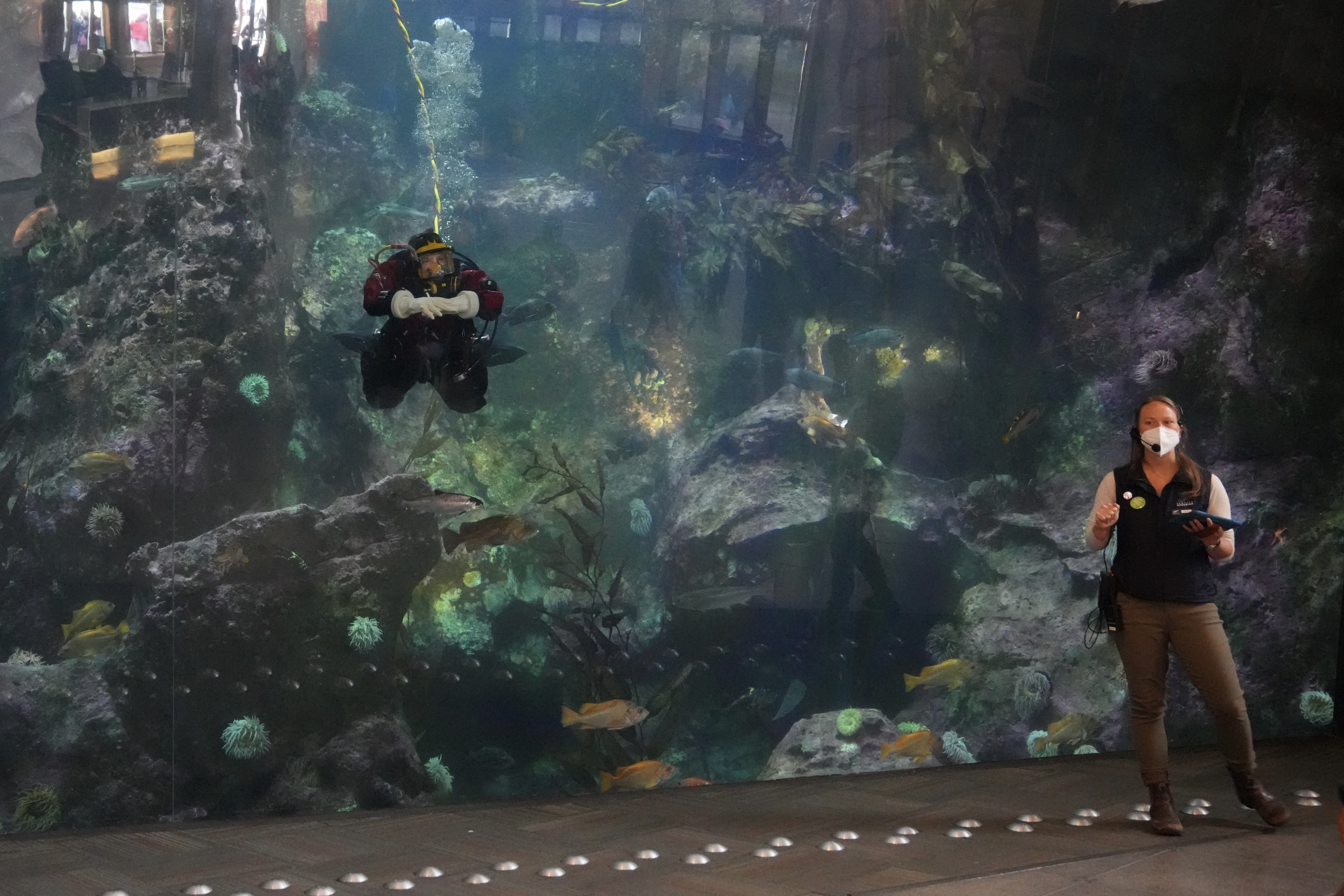
Dive Show in the Window on Washington Waters exhibit.

Window on Washington Waters is a 120,000-US-gallon (450,000 L) tank created as part of the 2007 expansion. It is meant to replicate the coastal waters of Washington state from about 5 to 60 feet (1.5 to 18.3 m), and features native marine life including salmon, rockfish, and sea anemones. Dive shows take place several times a day, divers wear special masks and converse with visitors.

Life on the Edge is a touch-tank where visitors touch live sea stars, urchins, sea cucumbers, and more. Two large exhibit pools that include touch zones allow visitors to see the tide pool life of Washington's outer coast and of Seattle's inland sea.

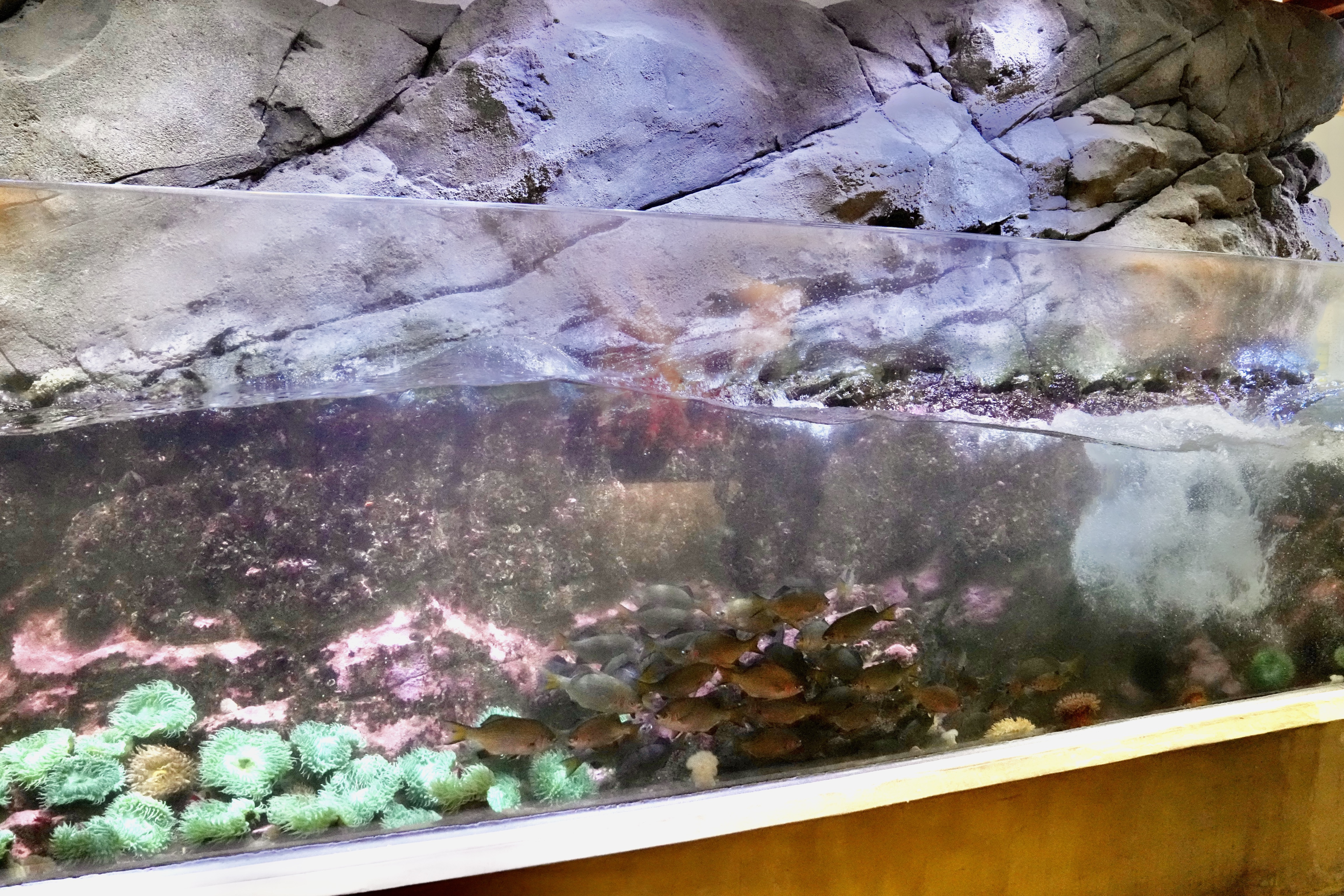
The Crashing Waves exhibit.

The Crashing Waves exhibit is a 40-foot (12 m) wave tank that replicates Washington shores from the intertidal zone to a depth of about 5 feet (1.5 m). This habitat features well adapted intertidal zone marine life such as sea cucumbers, snails, limpets, and more.

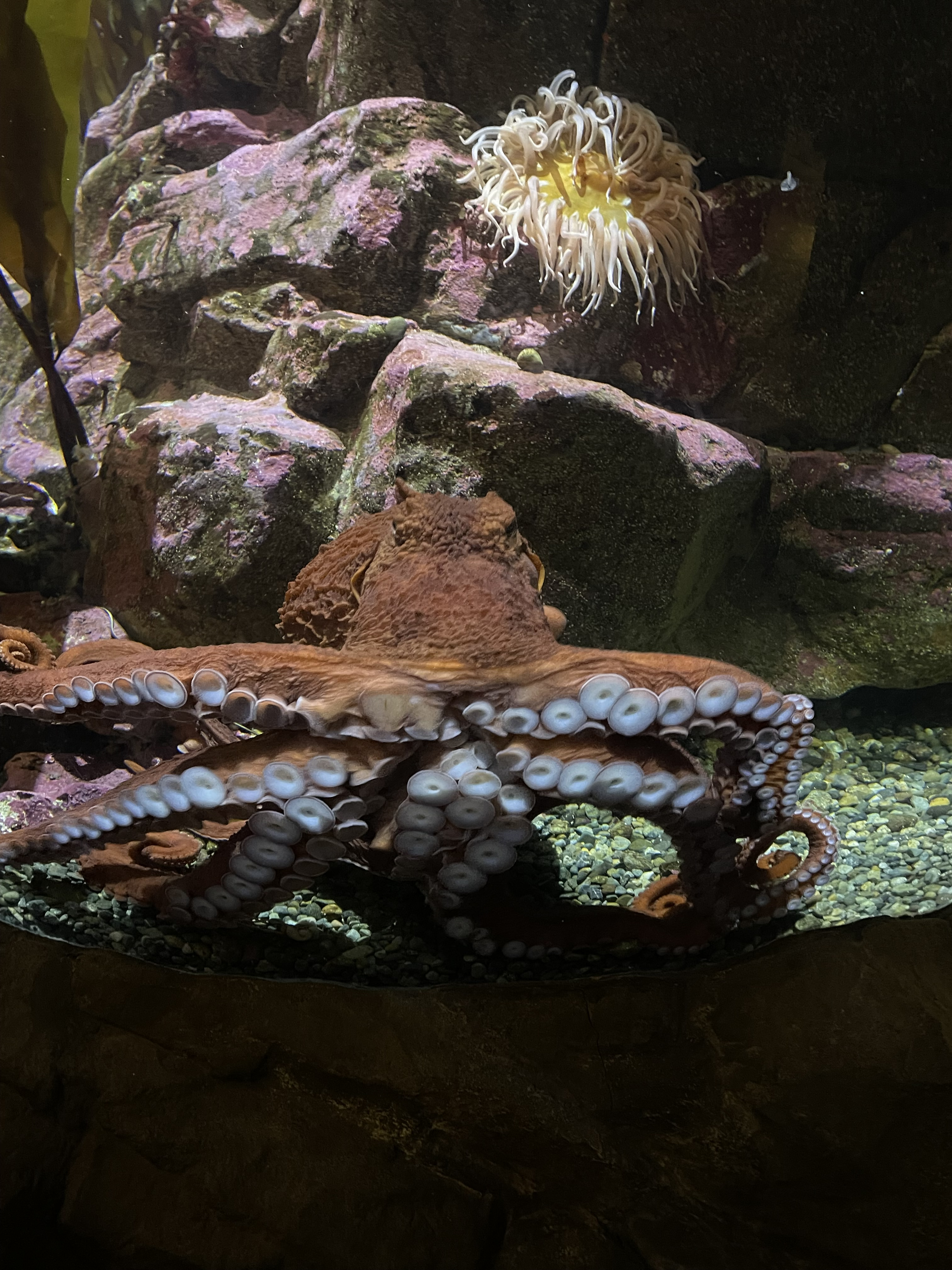
Seattle Aquarium's Giant Pacific Octopus

The Ring of Life features a 12 foot (3.7 m) high glass "donut" where visitors are surrounded by moon jellies.

The Giant Pacific Octopus is native to the Puget Sound and more broadly found in waters from California to Alaska and across the Pacific to Japan. The Seattle aquarium's octopus resides in a circular tank for viewing of the octopus - and the tank's other residents - from all angles.

A Closer Look Table has learning experiences regarding various aquatic creatures that changes frequently.

Caring Cove Play Space is a child friendly play space where kids and accompanying adults dress up, play with plush marine animals, explore faux tide pools, and read.

A Virtual Reality Experience is offered every 15 minutes.

=== Pier 60 ===
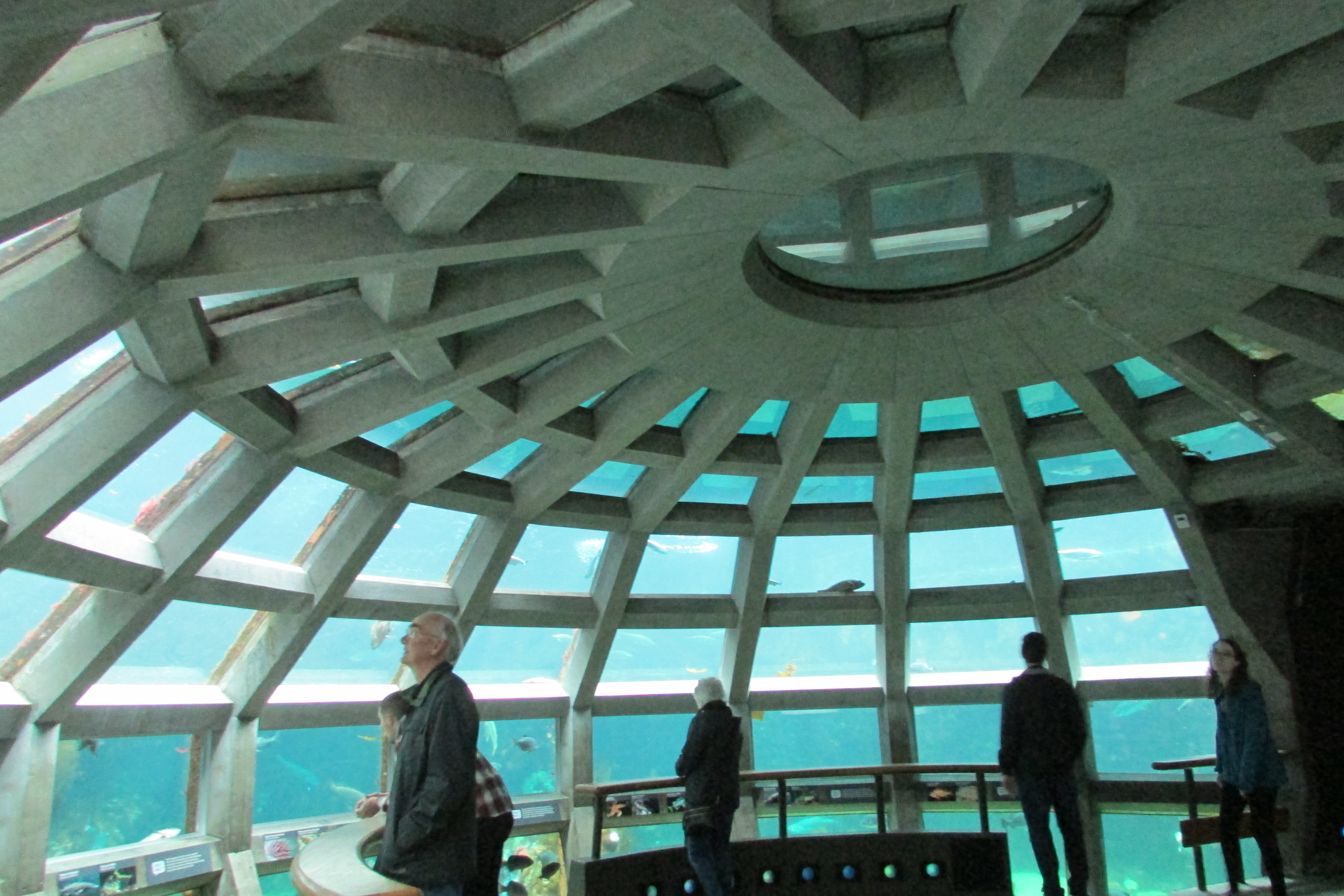
Underwater Dome exhibit.

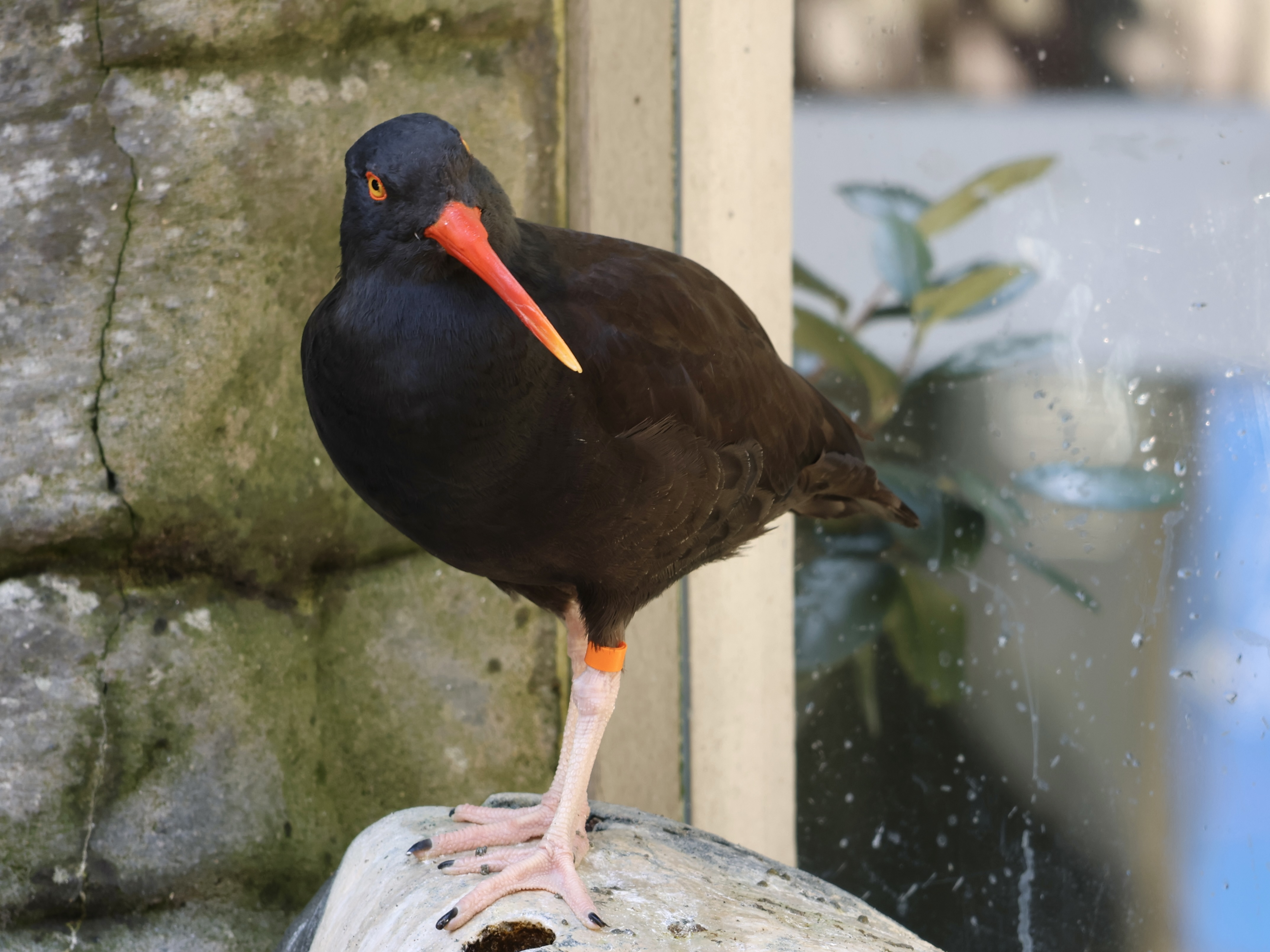
Black oystercatcher (Haematopus bachmani) from the Birds and Shores exhibit.

The Underwater Dome is a 360-degree exhibit viewed from a mostly transparent spherical undersea room in a 400,000-US-gallon (1,500,000 L) tank. It was built as part of the original construction and opened in 1977. The tank exhibits hundreds of species that would be found in Puget Sound including salmon, lingcod, sharks, sturgeon, skates, and rockfish.

Birds and Shores is an open-air habitat housing Puget Sound natives such as tufted puffins, rhinoceros auklets, common murres, and black oystercatchers. The habitat includes tidal pools and rocky cliffs above the water that support these coastal birds' natural breeding habits.

The Marine Mammals area includes exhibits for harbor seals, Northern fur seals, sea otters, and river otters. This exhibit offers visibility into these mammals' underwater world as well as their land habitat. Activities include frequent presentations and feedings.

Puget Sound Fish is a three-part exhibit that contains fish from the Puget Sound, broken into eelgrass communities, deep sandy bottoms, and rocky areas. Fish included in the tank are grunt sculpins, Pacific spiny lumpsuckers, gunnels and pricklebacks.

Salmon Life Cycle highlights salmon and their stages of development. This learning experience is informative of this keystone species that is integral to Puget Sound ecosystems and holds importance to Native Americans of the Pacific Northwest.

A window into the Veterinary Care Center allows visitors to watch marine life examinations by veterinary staff in the clinic.

Murals created by Ray Troll, Grace Freeman and Marvin E. Oliver, including two new murals introduced in 2023, cover the walls of the Marine Mammals enclosure.

=== Ocean Pavilion ===
The Ocean Pavilion features a nearly 500,000-US-gallon (1,900,000 L) tank for sharks and sting rays. The tank exhibits hundreds of species that would be found in the 'Coral Triangle' of Indonesia. The new multistory exhibit features several interpretive areas, including The Reef, The Archipelago, One Ocean Hall, At Home in the Ocean, an Animal Care Area, and a Discovery Lab. The Reef features a large immersive window into the exhibit tank, and At Home in the Ocean features smaller tanks and exhibits, including one for garden eels.

The exhibit replaced "Pacific Coral Reef", a man-made coral reef in a 25,000-US-gallon (95,000 L) tank that contained fish that live in and around reefs. This habitat simulated the unique and diverse reef ecosystem and closed in 2025.

== Conservation and research ==
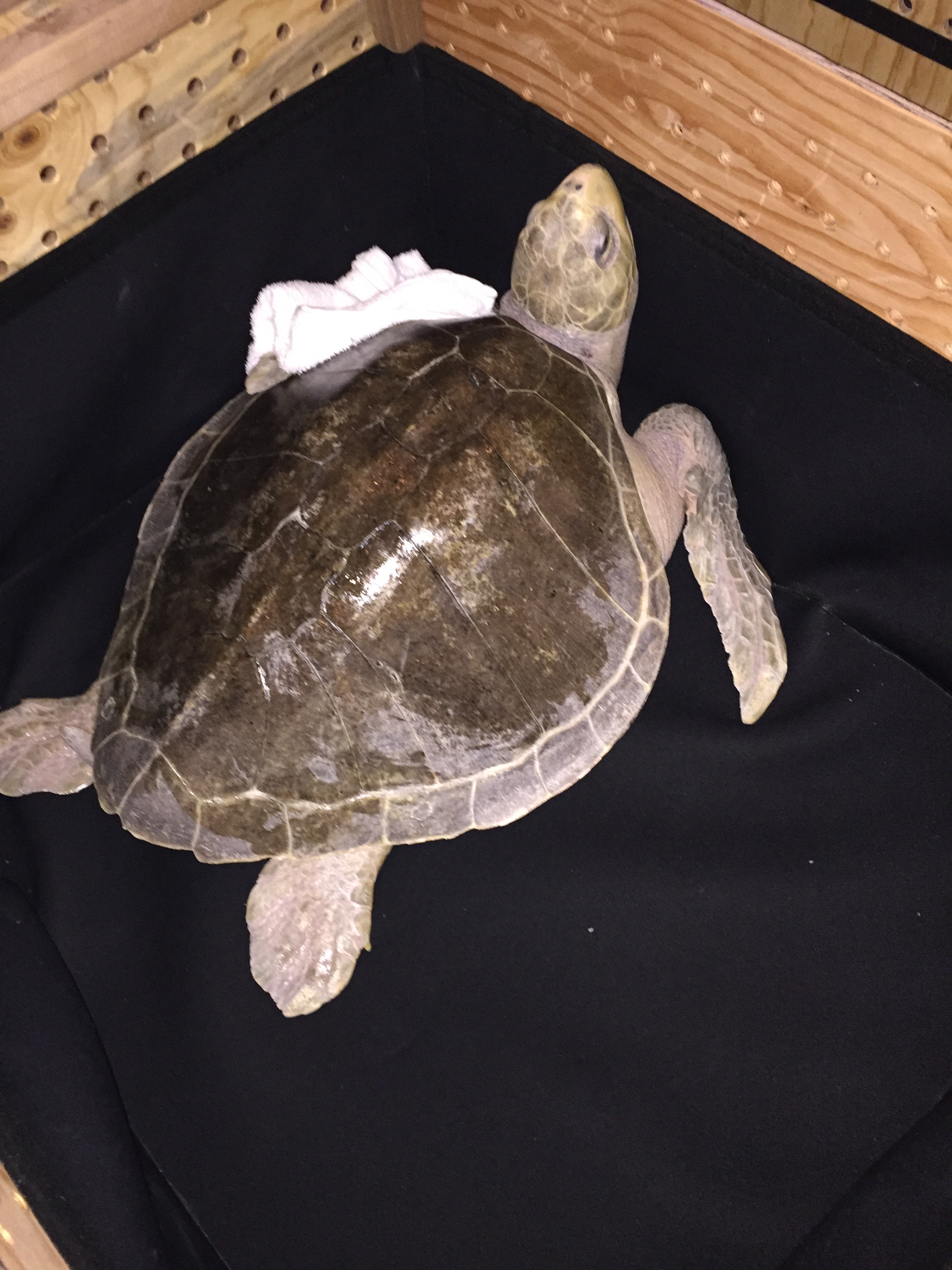
Tucker, a male olive ridley sea turtle was rescued from harsh winter storms and began a program of rehabilitation at the aquarium.

The Seattle Aquarium has participated in conservation efforts of various marine species by collaborating with indigenous peoples, governments, institutions, and companies.

In 2020, the Seattle Aquarium cofounded ReShark, an international conservation coalition, aiding in the recovery of zebra sharks in Indonesia. The new Ocean Pavilion building will provide breeding resources for the sharks and support a small group prior to their release into their natural habitat. As of 2023, this program, with partners in 15 countries and 44 aquariums, plans to release 500 zebra shark pups in Raja Ampat, Indonesia.

In 2021, the aquarium began to rear larval and juvenile pinto abalones, planning to release them each spring after 2022 into designated sites around the San Juan Islands and Strait of Juan de Fuca. These endangered species have faced a 97% decline, studies in the San Juan Islands show.

== Educational efforts ==
The Seattle Aquarium offers educational programs for students through high school. These include self guided educational programs that include group discounted rates, educational clinics, digital learning options, a high school volunteer program, and other programs and contests to promote hands-on learning. During the pandemic-induced school closures of 2020, the aquarium donated packages that included magnifying glasses and lessons to support distanced learning, along with offering online educational content. The aquarium has hosted and educated an estimated 2 million children at their programs since their implementation.

== In popular culture ==
A fictionalized Seattle Aquarium is prominently featured in the 2020 action-adventure game The Last of Us Part II. Its HBO adaptation also shows the Seattle Aquarium.

== Gallery ==
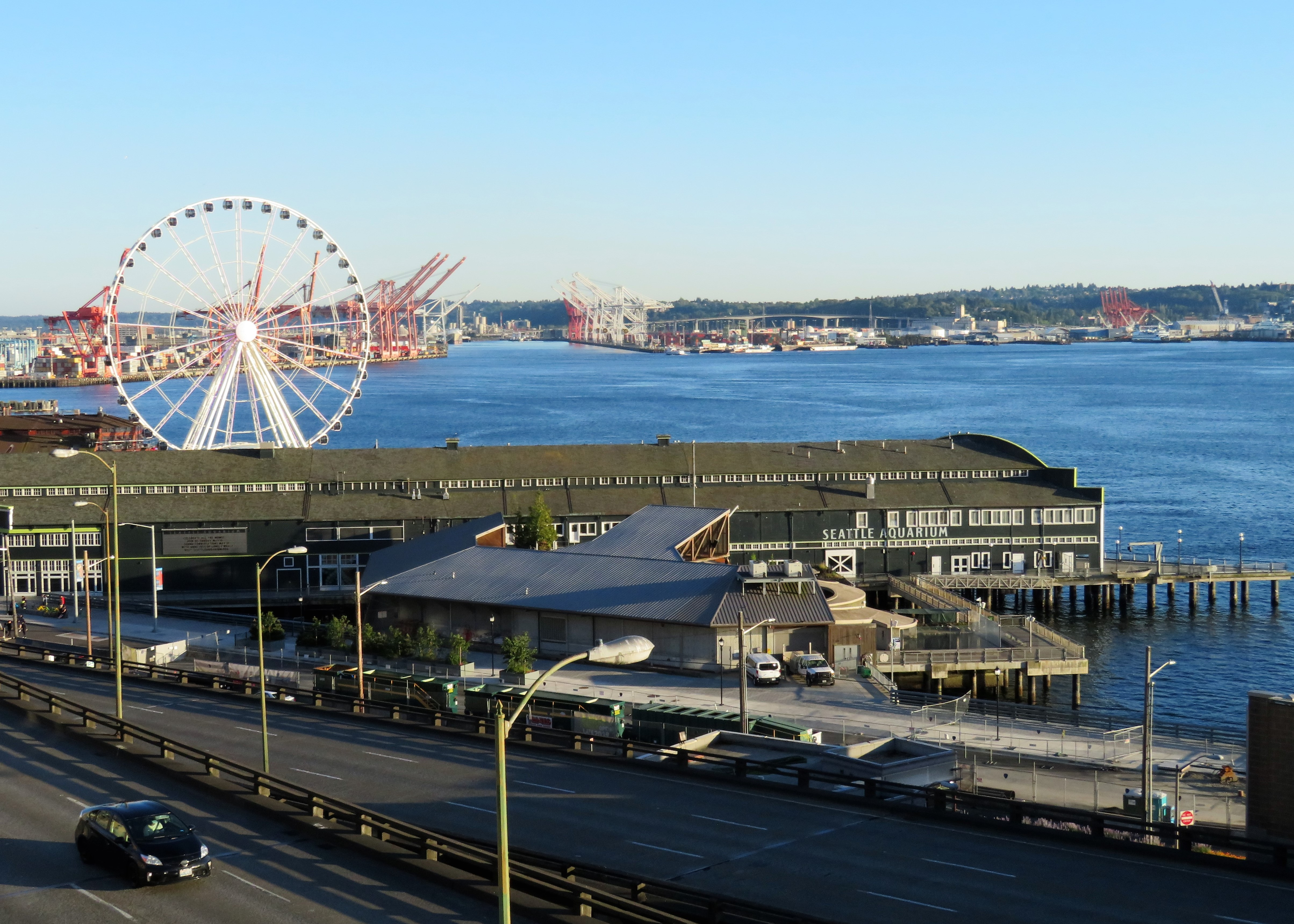
View of the aquarium over the water.

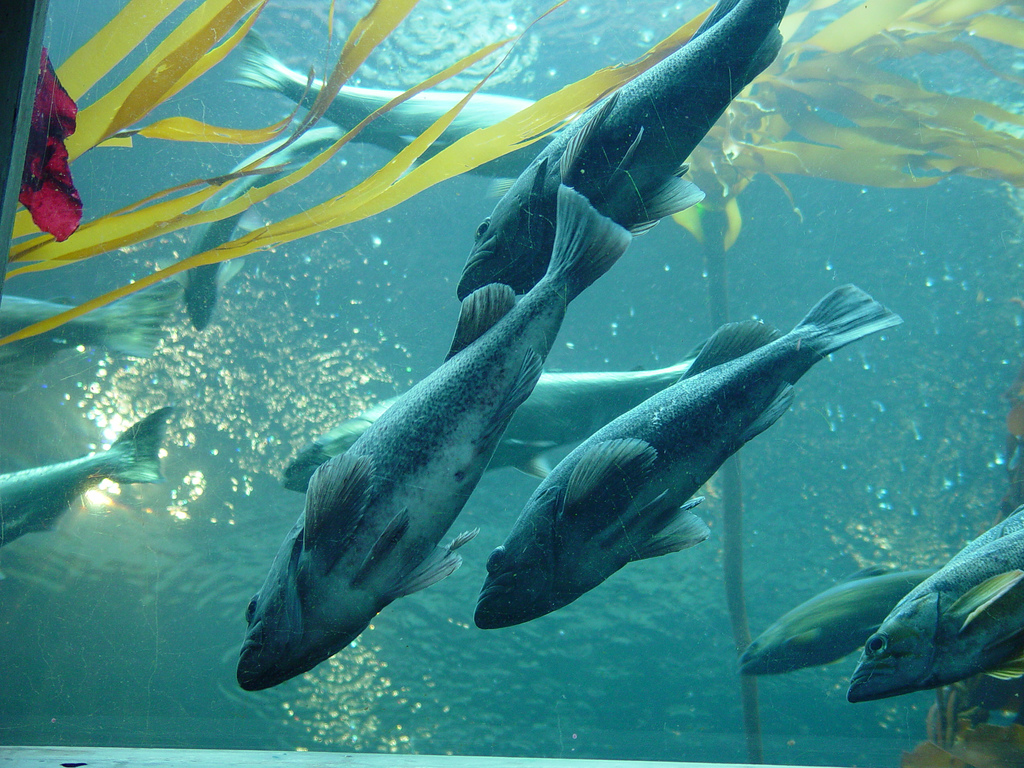
Rockfish in the aquarium's underwater dome.

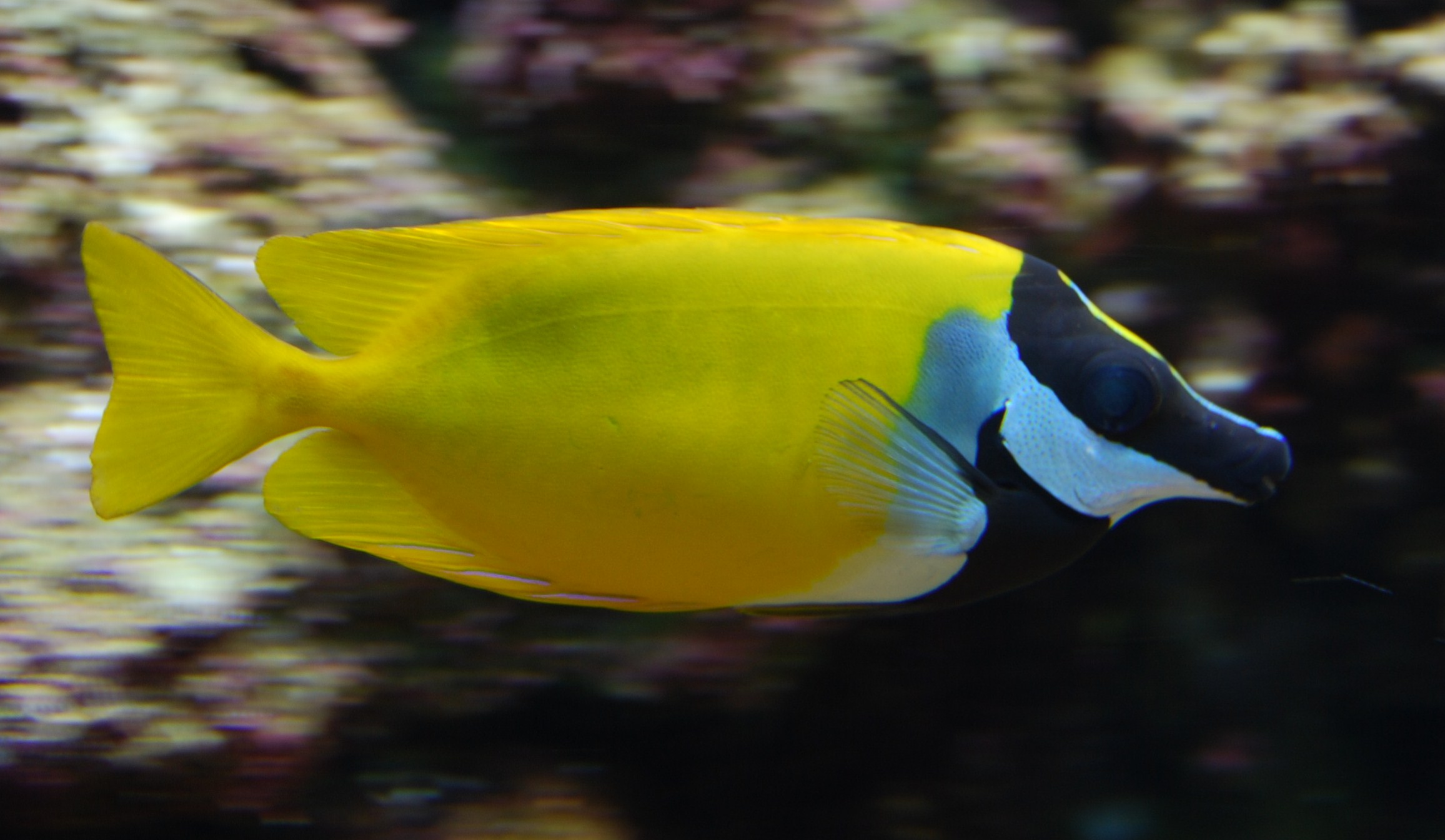
Foxface rabbitfish (Siganus vulpinus)

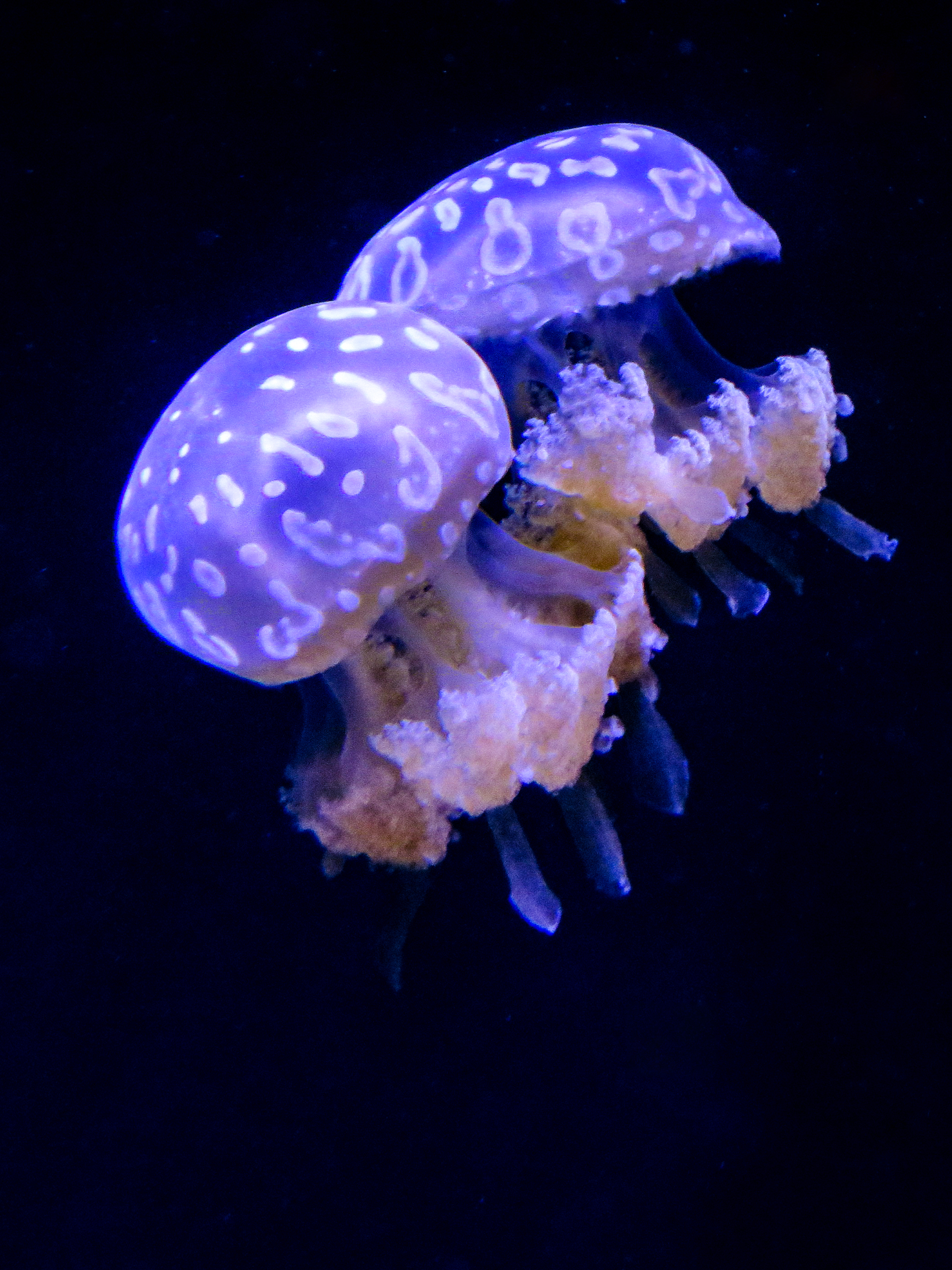
Sea jellies

Video of barnacles in the aquarium.

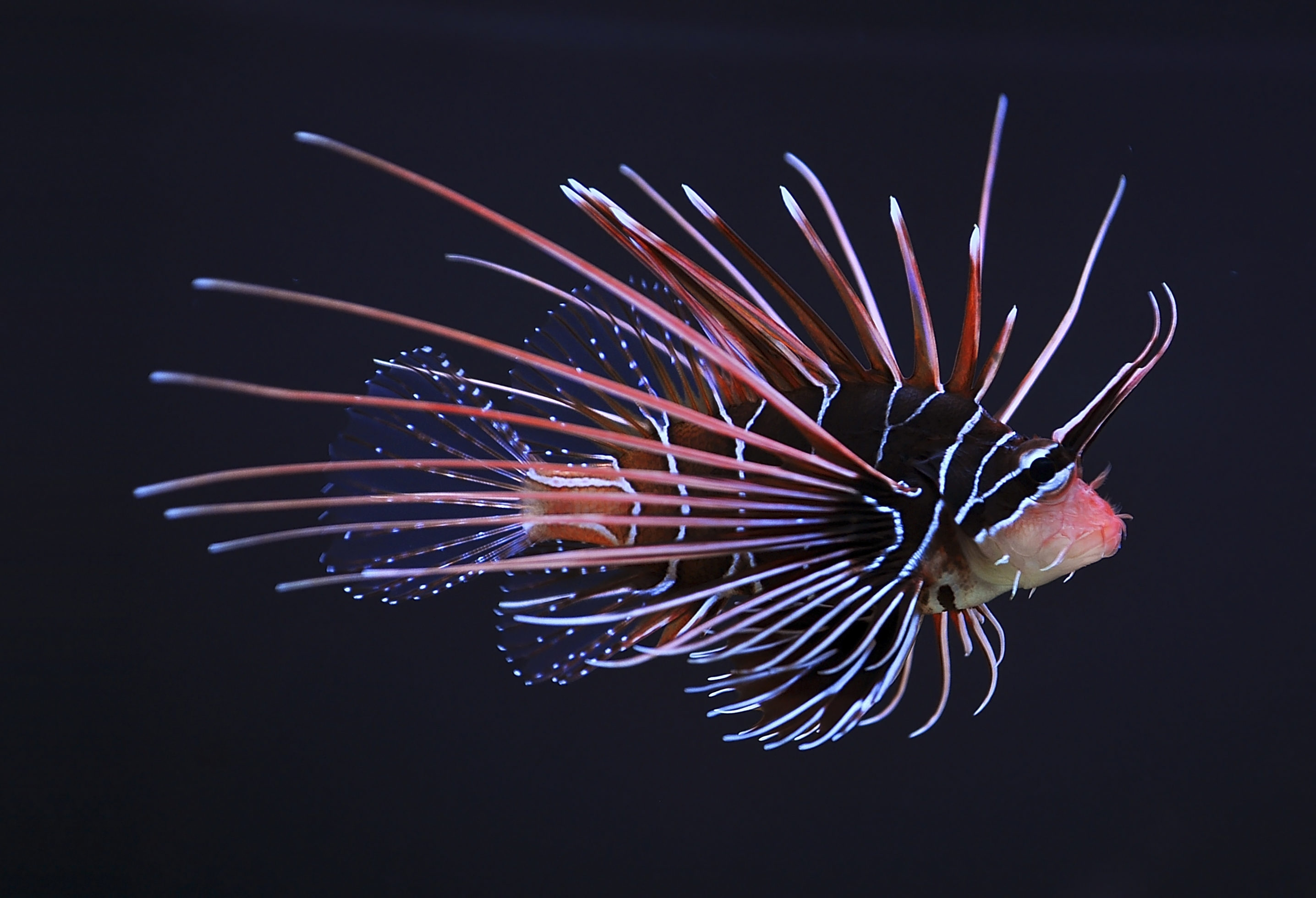
Clearfin lionfish (Pterois radiata)

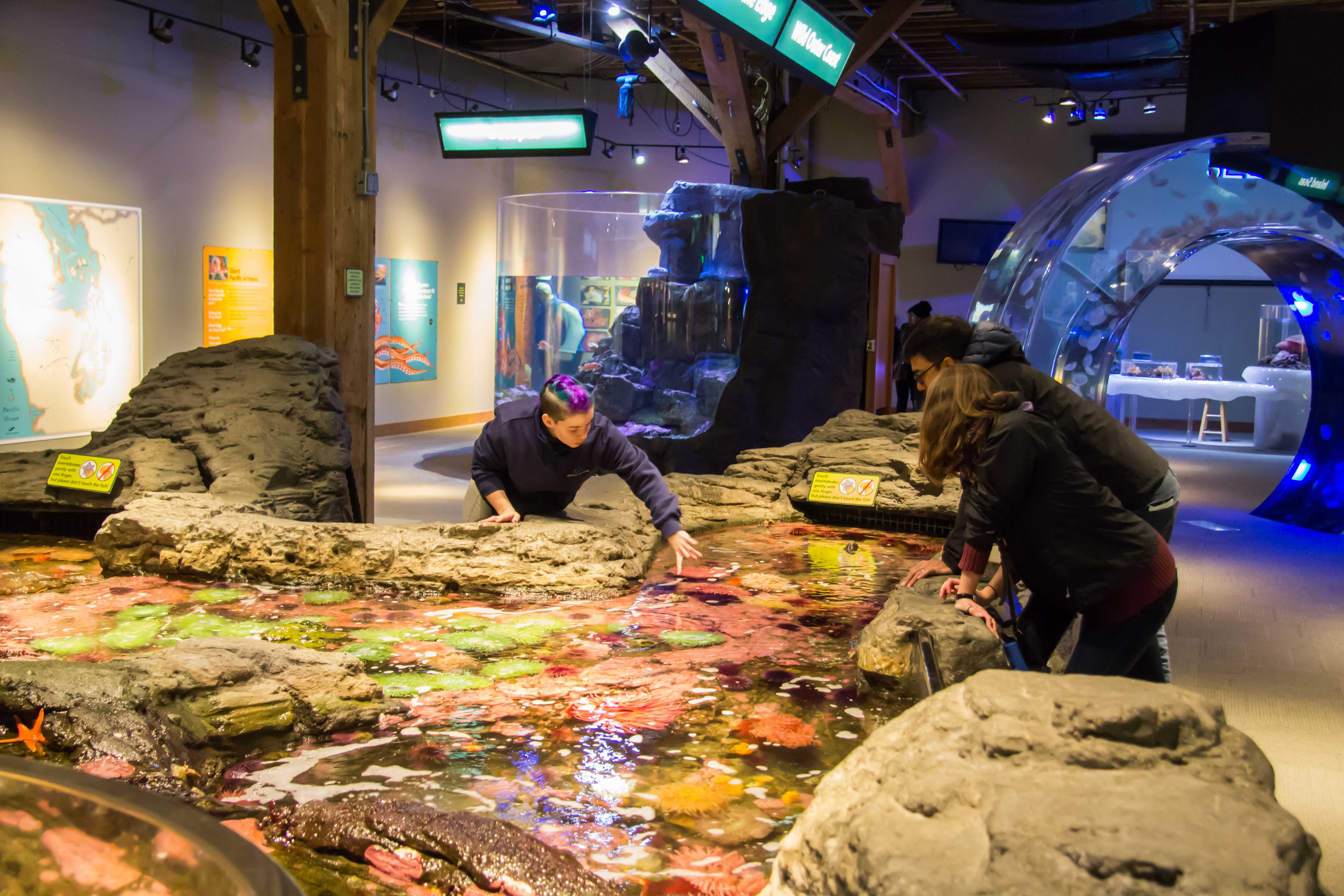
Touch tank in the Life on the Edge exhibit.

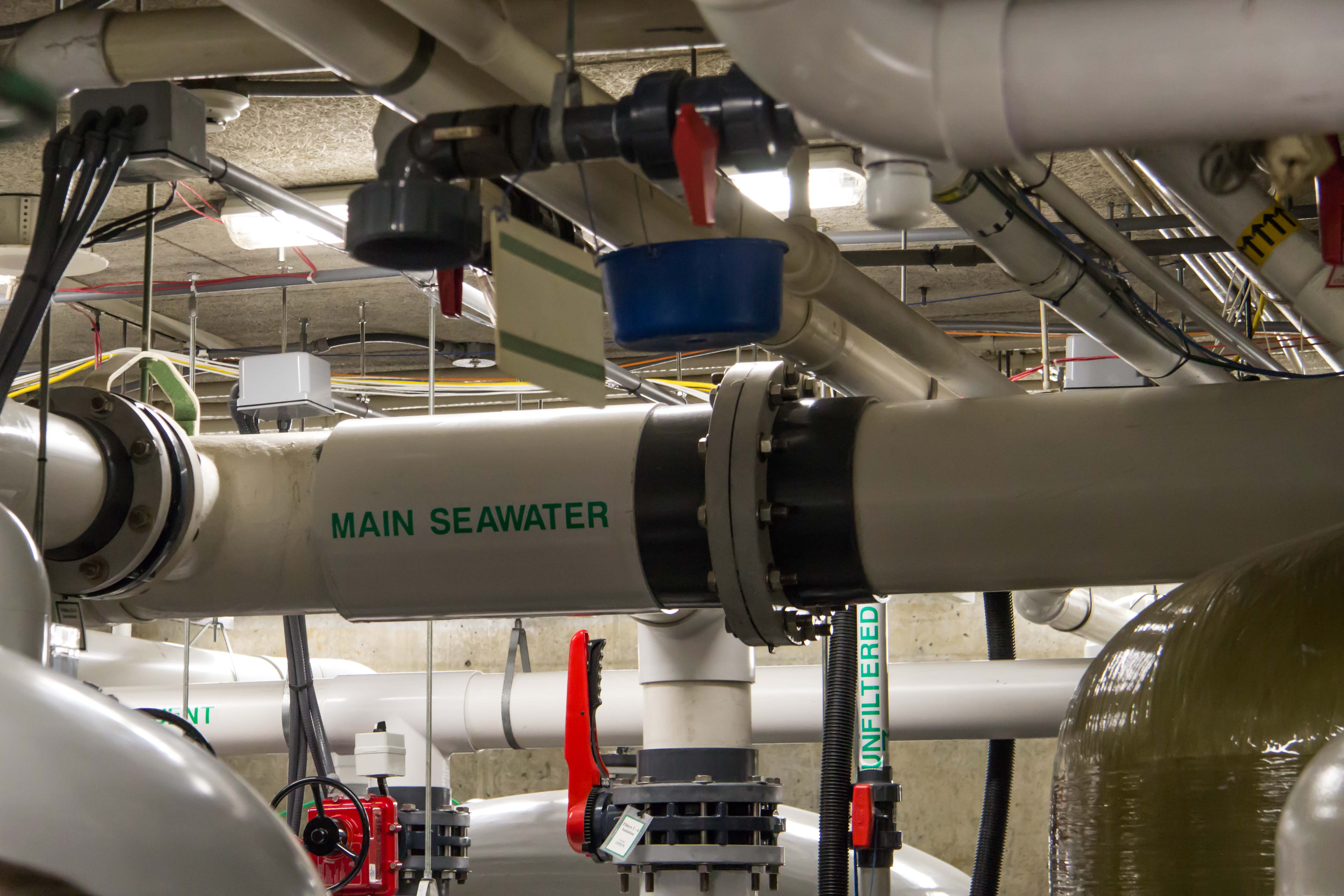
View of the complex aquarium pipework.

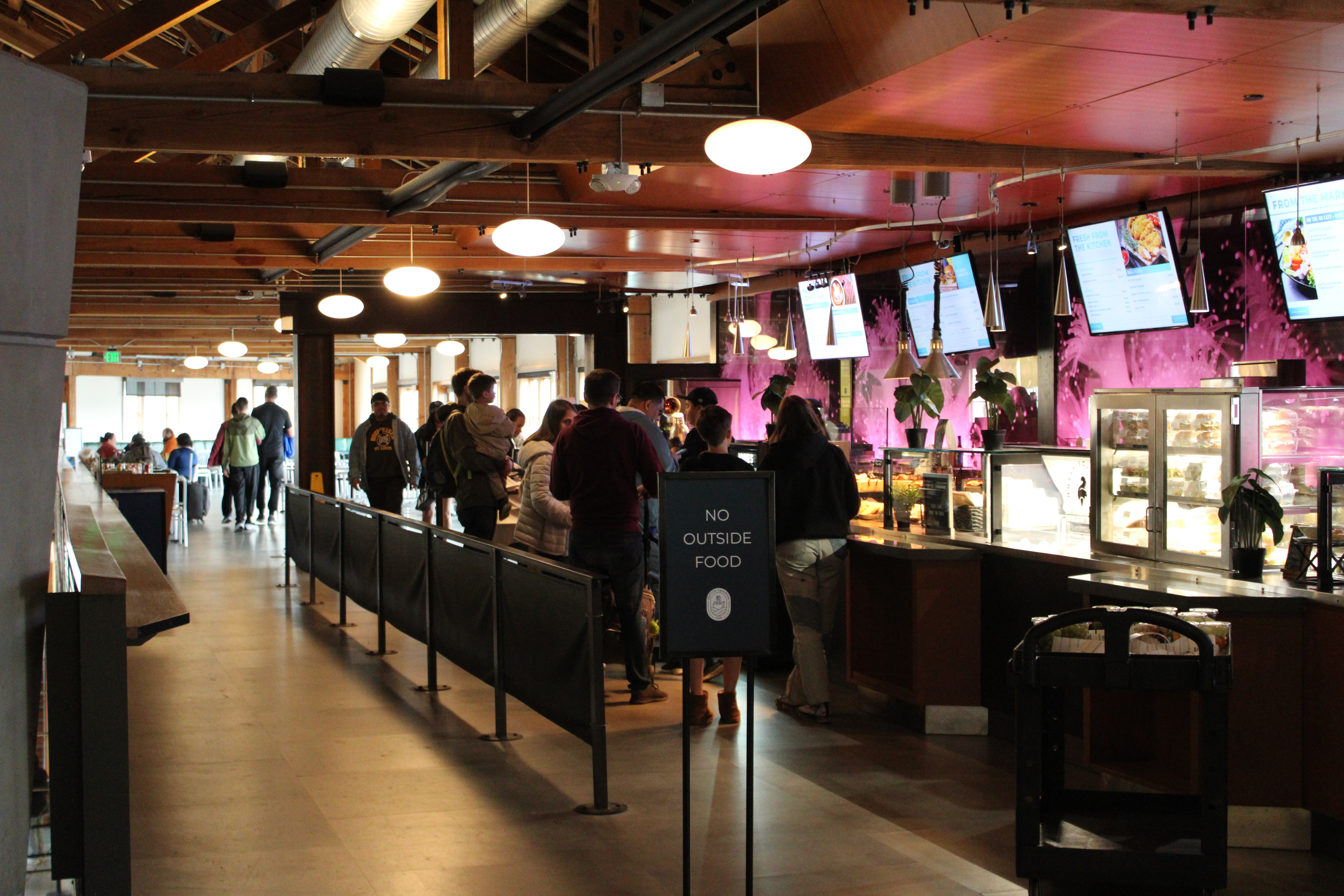
Cafe at the aquarium.

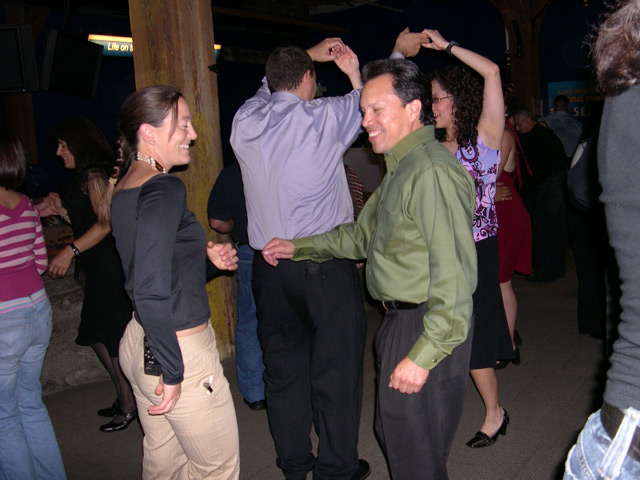
One of the many events held at the aquarium.
