= Waterfront Park (Seattle) =

Park in Seattle, Washington, United States

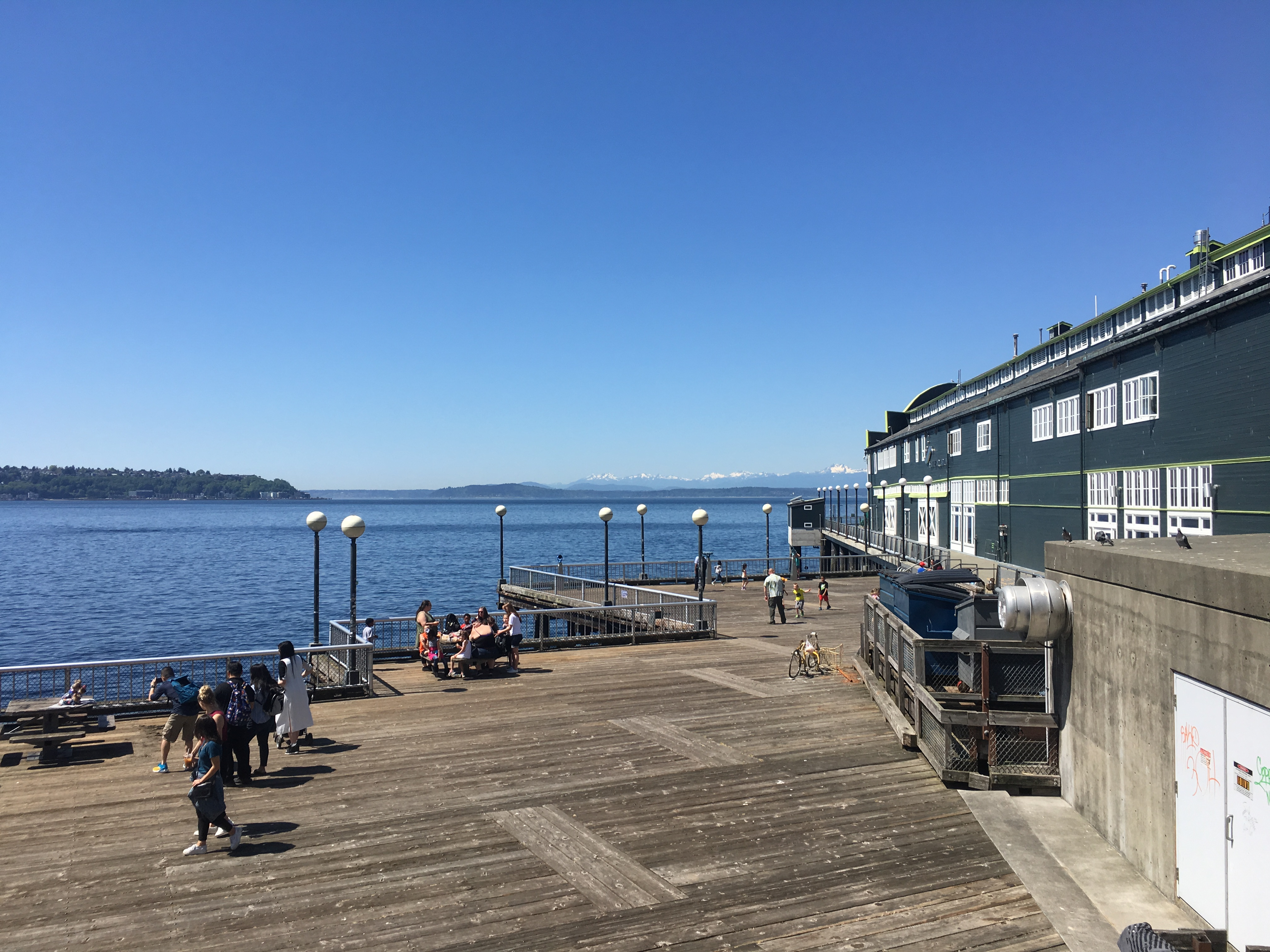
- Waterfront Park in May 2019
- Interactive map of Waterfront Park
- Type: Urban park
- Location: Seattle, Washington
- Coordinates: 47°36′25″N 122°20′31″W
- Established: 1968; 58 years ago
- Operator: Seattle Parks and Recreation

Waterfront Park is a public park on the Central Waterfront, Downtown, Seattle, Washington, USA. Designed by the Bumgardner Partnership and consultants, it was constructed on the site of the former Schwabacher Wharf (Pier 58). The original park closed in September 2020 after a failed inspection; the pier was completely removed by February 2021. A replacement park began construction in 2022, and the completed Waterfront Park officially opened on September 6, 2025.

== History of the site ==
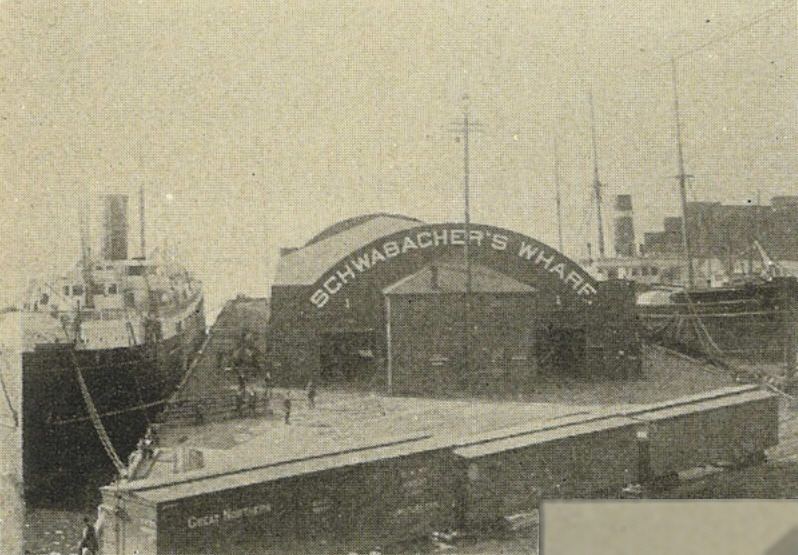
Schwabacher Wharf (1900).

In its early years, the pier then known variously as Schwabacher Wharf, Schwabacher's Wharf, Schwabacher Dock, etc. was the location of two prominent events in the city's history. The freighter Miike Maru opened Seattle's Japan trade by docking there August 31, 1896. Less than a year later, July 17, 1897, the steamship Portland arrived from Alaska bearing a "ton of gold", from the Klondike. The ensuing Yukon Gold Rush formed strong bonds between Seattle and Alaska, and brought enormous wealth to Seattle as the "Gateway to Alaska".

This portion of Seattle's waterfront was used by the military during World War II. By 1960, the Central Waterfront was beginning to take on its current recreational character, as shipping moved primarily to the container port in the Industrial District south of Downtown.

In 1968, King County voters approved a Forward Thrust bond issue to acquire the land for the park, which was matched by federal money and augmented several other sources including Model Cities programs, and donations. The new park opened on October 25, 1974, and cost $1.8 million to construct the first phase.

== The park ==
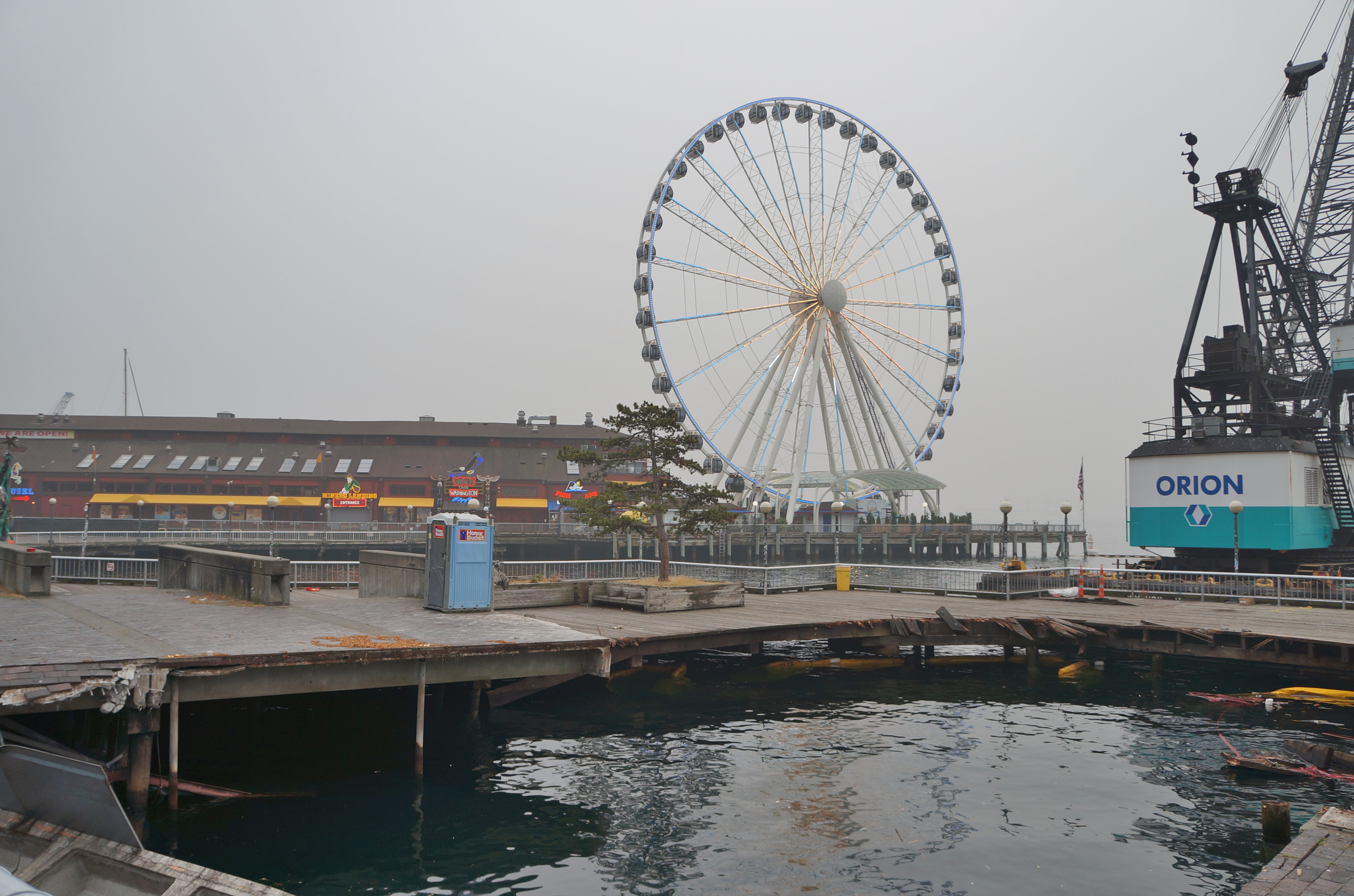
Aftermath of the 2020 partial collapse of Pier 58

The park extends from the privately owned Pier 57 to Pier 59, an official city landmark that is the site of the Seattle Aquarium. One of the entrances to the Aquarium is from a viewing platform in the park. The park viewing platforms can be reached both by stairs and a wheelchair-accessible ramp. The park also features coin-operated telescopes, benches, picnic tables, and some trees in planters. Near the picnic tables is Waterfront Fountain, made of cubes cast and welded bronze. The sculpture was a work in progress by artist James FitzGerald at the time of his death. In collaboration with his widow, Margaret Tompkins, it was completed by Terry Copple.

Waterfront Park was closed in August 2020 by the city government after an inspection found a gap of "several inches" between Pier 58 and the land. The pier was planned to be replaced in 2022 as part of the viaduct corridor program. An emergency order to dismantle the pier was approved by Mayor Jenny Durkan on August 14, 2020. During early work on removing Pier 58 on September 13, 2020, the central portion (including the bronze fountain) collapsed into Elliott Bay. Two construction workers fell into the water and were rescued with minor injuries that were treated at Harborview Medical Center. The adjacent Pier 57, which includes the Great Wheel and Miner's Landing, was closed on September 18 after an inspection found that the southern section of Pier 58 could collapse and become hazardous to the adjacent pier.

The removal of Pier 58 was completed in February 2021; the adjacent pedestrian walkway was reopened the following April. The rebuilt pier is triangular in shape, with a lawn and playground centered around a 18-foot (5.5 m) jellyfish structure. The fountain, which was retrieved during cleanup of the collapse by divers, was restored and returned to Pier 58 with a new basin. A new Coast Salish sculpture, Family by Qwalsius-Shaun Peterson, will be installed on the promenade facing the park.
