= List of works by George Tsutakawa =

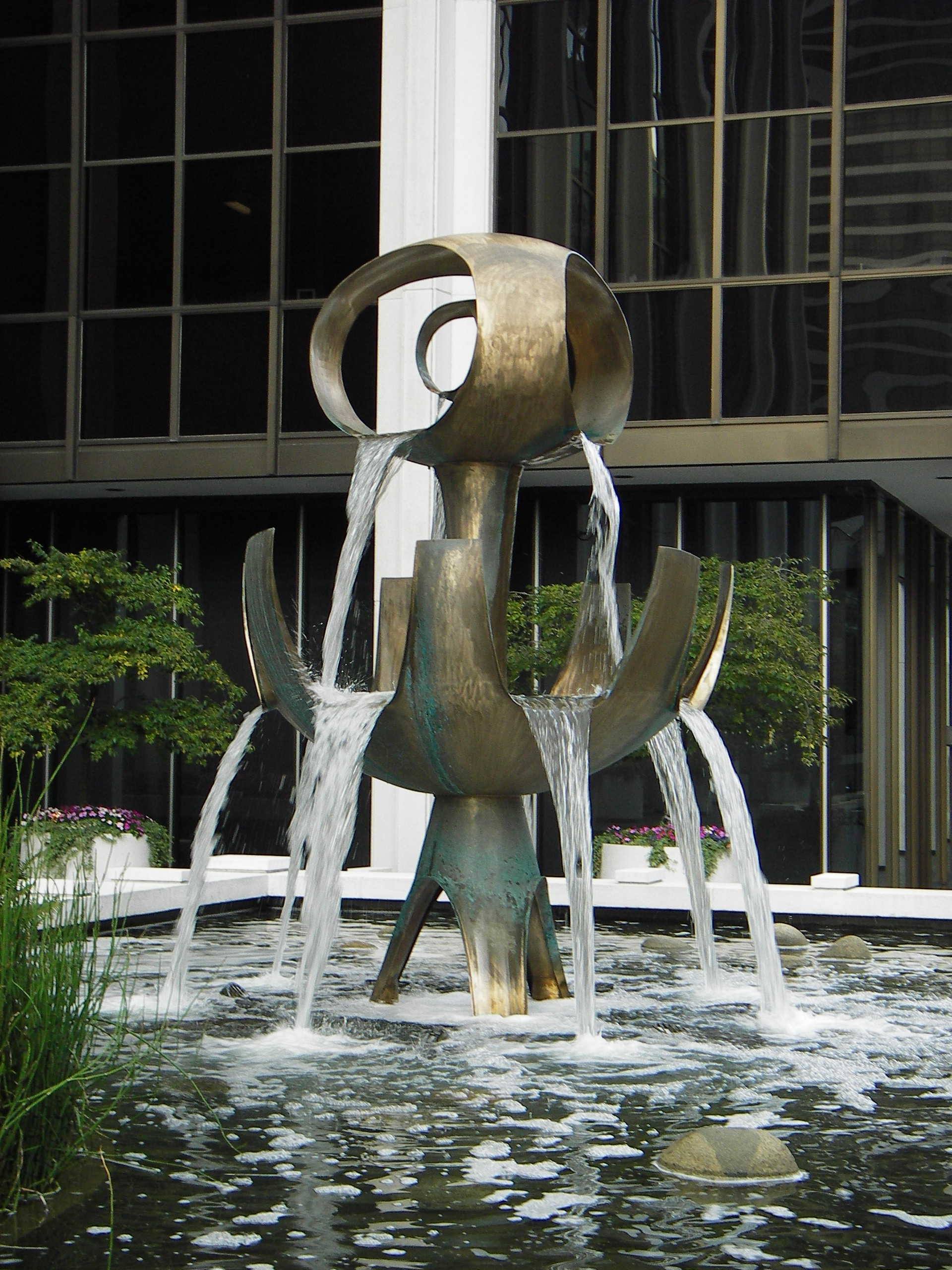
Fountain of the Pioneers, Vancouver, British Columbia

American painter and sculptor George Tsutakawa has created approximately 75 public fountains and sculptures, which are displayed in the United States, Canada, and Japan.

In 2023, the Cascadia Art Museum in Edmonds hosted the exhibition "George Tsutakawa: Early Works on Paper", which featured block prints, sketches, and watercolors from as early as 1929.

== Paintings ==
- Early Winter, Mount Rainier (1957)

== Sculptures ==
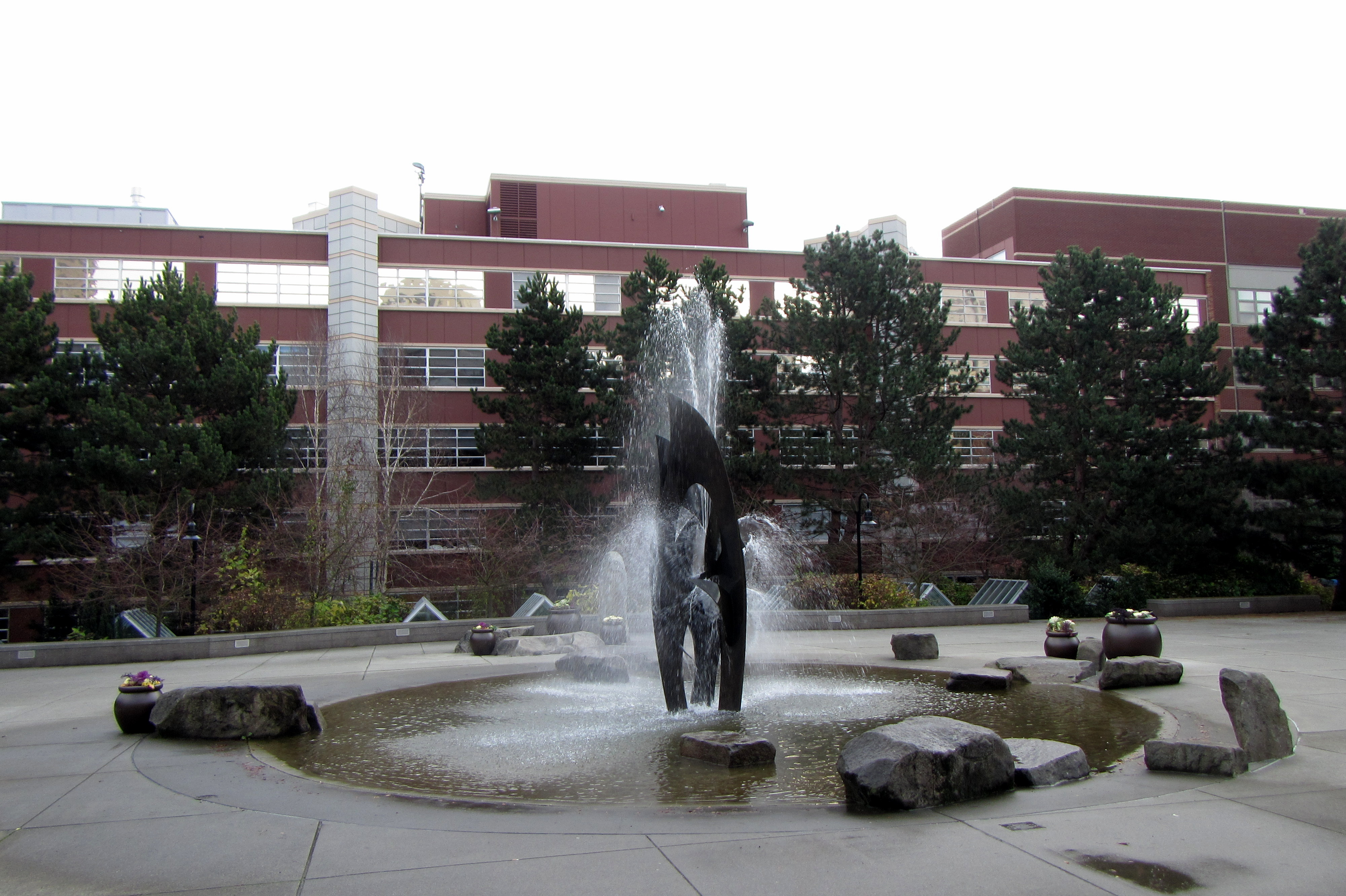
Centennial Fountain, Seattle University

- Centennial Fountain, Seattle University
- Fountain (1971), Seattle Art Museum
- Fountain of Reflection (1962), Seattle
- Fountain of the Pioneers, Vancouver, British Columbia
- Fountain of Wisdom, Seattle
- Heaven, Man Earth
- Hobart Fountain, Troy, Ohio
- Jefferson Plaza Fountain
- Joshua Green Fountain
- Mo (Seaweed), 1977
- Moon Song
- Naramore Fountain
- Obos 69, University of California, Los Angeles
- Safeco Fountain
- Sand Dragon
- Sandworm
