= Andrew Chinn =

American painter

West Lake, Andrew Chinn, watercolor, 1935.

Andrew Chinn (1915–1996) was a Chinese-American artist and art educator, active in the Pacific Northwest from the early 1930s through the 1990s. He is known for his distinctive style of watercolor painting and printmaking, and is associated with the Northwest's Asian-American arts community, the WPA artists of the Great Depression/World War II era, and, peripherally, the Northwest School of painters.

== Life and career ==
Andrew Nan Chinn's parents emigrated from Toyshan, Canton (modern Taishan, Guangdong), China, to the United States in about 1910. He was born in Seattle, Washington, on June 17, 1915. After his mother died of influenza in 1918, he and his older sister Ann returned to Toyshan, where, with the encouragement of his grandfather, he learned traditional calligraphy. He also became interested in painting, which, in China of the Sun Yat Sen era, was beginning to show the influence of modern European trends.

Chinn returned to the US in 1927, went back to China in 1929, and then moved to Seattle for good in 1933. He attended Broadway High School, where his classmates included artists Fay Chong, George Tsutakawa, and Morris Graves. He, Chong, and other young artist friends formed the Chinese Art Club, holding monthly shows at a shared studio in Seattle's International District. Morris Graves, Kenneth Callahan, and William Cumming - future members of the acclaimed 'Northwest School' of painters - were frequent guests.

In 1939 Chinn enrolled in the University of Washington, where he studied art under Walter Isaacs, Ambrose Patterson, Ray Hill, and others. While a student he had paintings accepted for juried shows at both the Seattle Art Museum and the Frye Museum.

Cranes and Lotus, 1935, Andrew Chinn. Woodblock print.

In 1941 he joined the Works Progress Administration's Federal Art Project, under R. Bruce Inverarity, the program's director for Washington. He worked alongside Graves, Chong, Guy Anderson, Helmi Juvonen, Jacob Elshin, Julius Twohy, and other notable painters, printmakers, and sculptors.

In 1945 he began a 31-year career as a technical artist at the Boeing company, and became a founder of the Boeing Art Club; around this time he was also accepted for membership in the Puget Sound Group, the Northwest's oldest artists' association. In 1946 he began teaching evening classes in watercolor painting at Seattle Central Community College (originally Edison Technical School), which he would continue to do for over 45 years.

While the Abstract expressionism of the Northwest mystics turned the art world on its head in the 1950s, and George Tsutakawa, Paul Horiuchi, and Frank Okada revolutionized Asian-American art in the 1960s, Chinn remained almost defiantly committed to the style he'd developed and loved most: traditional Asian art (often including Chinese calligraphic inscriptions) done using Western perspective, with aspects of American realism and European impressionism. An avid outdoorsman, his subject matter was most commonly the natural scenery that he loved. He usually painted from life, instead of using photos or sketches.

Although his more conservative style kept him out of Seattle's avant-garde galleries, he remained a well-respected figure in the Pacific Northwest, and had his work regularly exhibited in the area's mainstream museums and galleries.
