= Robert Bruce Inverarity =

Robert Bruce Inverarity, self-portrait, 1938. Robert Bruce Inverarity papers, Archives of American Art, Smithsonian Institution.

Robert Bruce Inverarity (July 5, 1909 – August 6, 1999) was an American artist, art educator, photographer, museum director, author, and anthropologist. He was the Washington State Director of the Federal Arts Project from 1936 to 1939 and the Washington Arts Project from 1939 to 1941, working with many noted Pacific Northwest artists. Fascinated with the Indian tribes of the Northwest from early youth, he amassed a major collection of North Pacific Coast Native art and authored several works on the subject.

As an artist he was best known for his woodblock and linocut printmaking, and for his photographs of artist friends such as Max Ernst, Dorothea Tanning, Marcel Duchamp, Man Ray, Rockwell Kent, and Mark Tobey. He developed and directed the Museum of International Folk Art in Santa Fe, New Mexico, the Adirondack Museum in Blue Mountain Lake, New York, and the Philadelphia Maritime Museum.

== Early life ==
Robert Bruce Inverarity was born July 5, 1909, in Seattle, Washington, the son of Duncan George Inverarity and Rosalind Wallace Dunlop Inverarity. His father was a manager and promoter of the Northwest vaudevillean theater circuit, and was a prominent member of various Seattle civic and social organizations; he had also served as an assistant to photographer Edward S. Curtis on the Harriman Alaska Expedition of 1899.

The family lived in Canada during much of Bruce's youth, but moved back to Seattle when he was a teenager. From boyhood he had been interested in both art and Native American culture, and after graduating from Garfield High School in 1928 he undertook a 500-mile hike along the coasts of Vancouver Island, studying the legends of local Indian tribes and collecting artifacts.

By age eighteen the blonde, six-and-a-half foot tall, pipe-smoking young artist had already achieved a degree of local notoriety. A 1928 newspaper profile described him as "one of the most unusual people in Seattle, no matter how you look at him. He's Seattle's youngest recognized artist. He's taking an active part in introducing 'modern art' to a city that knew him as a school boy."

== Career ==
While still attending high school in Seattle, Inverarity briefly studied under Mark Tobey, with whom he shared a studio. He later took over Tobey's position as a teacher at the Cornish School. He then spent a few years in California working as an artist and teacher, with his paintings and prints shown in a number of solo and group exhibitions. He eventually moved to Vancouver, B.C. where he was Director of the School of Creative Art. He also studied the culture and lore of the Haida people of British Columbia's Queen Charlotte Islands (as of 2010, known as Haida Gwaii) during a three-month trip in 1932. Returning to Seattle the following year, he joined the University of Washington Drama School as a puppetry instructor, and in 1938 published his highly regarded Manual of Puppetry.

San Francisco Cable Car, woodblock print,1935, by Robert Bruce Inverarity.

Inverarity had a one-man show at Edward Weston's gallery in Carmel, California in 1929, and another exhibition of his paintings that same year at the Blanding Sloan Gallery. In 1931 he exhibited with the Brooklyn Society of Etchers and had a one-man show at the Hudson Bay Company in Vancouver, BC. His work was shown at Gump's in San Francisco in 1935, and he had a piece exhibited at the 1939 New York World's Fair. He became a member of the Northwest Printmakers Society, the California Watercolor Society, and the Royal Society of Arts, London.

Inverarity took a leave of absence from the University of Washington to become, in 1936, State Director of the Federal Art Project. In this capacity he provided employment for many notable artists (including William Cumming, Helmi Juvonen, Morris Graves, Carl Morris, Richard V. Correll, Hannes Bok, Guy Anderson, Hilda Grossman, Malcolm Roberts, Mark Tobey, Andrew Chinn, Jacob Elshin, Fay Chong, Julius Twohy, Z. Vanessa Helder, Joseph Solman, James FitzGerald, Kenneth Downer, and Ruth Egri) and oversaw the creation of the popular Spokane Art Center. His tenure was not without controversy. Artists and financial backers of the program questioned his management style and artistic credentials, while political concerns threatened the existence of the FAP (which became, in 1939, the Washington Arts Project). Inverarity, however, managed to retain the directorship until the program was ended by wartime priorities early in 1942. With American involvement in the Second World War, Inverarity served as the U.S. Navy's Chief of Design for Camouflage (1941–1943), and later as an official Navy war artist (1943–1945)

Following the war, Inverarity completed his formal education. He earned Bachelor's degrees in art and anthropology from the University of Washington in 1946, and then studied with Hilaire Hiler at Fremont College in Los Angeles, receiving a Master's degree in fine arts in 1947 and a Ph.D. in 1948. This period also saw the publication of several books he had authored, including Masks and Marionettes of the Northwest Coast Indians (1940), Moveable Masks and Figures of the North Pacific Coast Indians (1941), Northwest Coast Indian Art (1946), and The Art of the Northwest Coast Indians (1950). Although Inverarity ceased exhibiting his work in 1941, he continued creating art, including illustrations for his and other books, and continued with his longtime interest in photography. Among his best-known works are his portraits of artist friends such as Glenn Wessels, Dorothea Tanning, Max Ernst, Mark Tobey, Morris Graves, Marcel Duchamp, Man Ray, and Stanton Macdonald-Wright.

Aurora Sky, Robert Bruce Inverarity, pastel, 1931.

Combining his interests in art and anthropology, Inverarity became the founding director of the Museum of International Folk Art in Santa Fe, New Mexico, in 1949. During his five years as director, the museum participated in a pilot study for an innovative system of coding visual files. Inverarity also remained active with the American Anthropological Association and the American Association for the Advancement of Science, and wrote several articles for anthropological journals. When Inverarity was fired by the Museum of International Folk Art in 1954, most of the staff resigned in protest, triggering an investigation by the American Association of Museums. He went on to serve as director of the Adirondack Museum in Blue Mountain Lake, New York from 1954 to 1965. After a period working as an illustrator and designer for the University of California Press, he returned to the East Coast in 1969 to serve as director of the Philadelphia Maritime Museum.

== Later years ==
Inverarity retired in 1976 and moved to La Jolla, California. He sold his unique and extensive collection of Northern Coastal Native art and artifacts to the British Museum for what he described as "a tidy sum".

He died in La Jolla on August 6, 1999.

The helmet logo used by the NFL's Seattle Seahawks football team is based on an image of a Kwakwaka'wakw transformation mask taken from Inverarity's 1950 book Art of the Northwest Coast Indians.
