= Johsel Namkung =

American photographer (1919–2013)

- Born: 1919; Gwangju, Korea, Empire of Japan
- Died: July 22, 2013 (aged 93–94)

Korean name
- Hangul: 남궁요설
- Hanja: 南宮堯卨
- RR: Namgung Yoseol
- MR: Namgung Yosŏl

Johsel Namkung (Korean: 남궁요설; 1919 – July 22, 2013) was an American photographer of Korean origin. He was best known for his nature and landscape photography.

He was born in 1919 in Gwangju, Korea, Empire of Japan. Namkung studied at The Tokyo Conservatory in Japan for voice. Namkung and his wife, Mineko, immigrated to the United States in 1947 after they both received scholarships to attend the University of Washington School of Music. Namkung earned a Masters in Music from University of Washington. He worked for Northwest Airlines but then left in 1956 to study printmaking and photography. In 1958 he attended one of Ansel Adams' week-long workshops. Namkung was also friends with many other Seattle artists including Mark Tobey, George Tsutakawa, Kenneth Callahan.

Namkung worked at the University of Washington Medical Center as a medical photographer for 25 years but would continue his nature photography outside of work. Namkung's 1966 and 1973 solo exhibitions of his nature photography are held by the University of Washington's Henry Art Gallery. Namkung's photographs are in the collection of Seattle Art Museum. In 1978, the Seattle Art Museum hosted a solo Namkung show. From September 1994 through January 1995, Namkung's photographs were on display alongside the work of other artists like Val Leigo, Paul Horiuchi, George Tsutakawa, at the Wing Luke Museum in the show, "They Painted From Their Hearts: Pioneer Asian American Artists." In 2006, the Seattle Asian Art Museum hosted another solo Namkung show.

Namkung died on July 22, 2013.

In 2025, the Cascadia Art Museum held a retrospective of Namkung's work in a show titled, Silent Songs: The Photography of Johsel Namkung.
