= Val Laigo =

Filipino-American artist (1930 – 1992)

Val Laigo (January 23,1930 – December 11,1992) was a Filipino-American visual artist. He was born in Naguilian, La Union, Philippines, on January 23, 1930. He died in 1992. He is known for his work on local projects in the greater Seattle, Washington community, which ranges from community murals to mosaics. Laigo created an outdoor mosaic called East is West that sits in the center of the Dr. José Rizal Park in Beacon Hill, Seattle, Washington. His work often involves themes of immigration and the colonial and imperial histories in the Philippines and the Pacific, especially the Philippine-American War during the beginning of the nineteenth century. As a child, Laigo moved to the United States. He legally shifted his name from Valeriano to Val in order to assimilate. In the 1930s, he moved and settled in Seattle, Washington, where he "found a community" and "sustained his identity as a Filipino American and a burgeoning artist."

From September 1994 through January 1995, Laigo, alongside other artists like Johsel Namkung, Paul Horiuchi, George Tsutakawa, had work on display at the Wing Luke Museum in the show, "They Painted From Their Hearts: Pioneer Asian American Artists."

== Legacy ==
The Seattle Department of Neighborhoods designated Laigo's house located at 224 14^{th} Avenue North as a historically significant site.
