= Ten million (disambiguation) =

Ten million is the natural number following 9,999,999 and preceding 10,000,001.

Ten million or 10,000,000 may also refer to:

- Ten Million (1889–1964), American minor league baseball player
- 10000000, a 2012 tile-matching video game by EightyEight Games

== See also ==
- Crore, the term for ten million in the Indian numbering system
