= Marcus Tsutakawa =

Marcus Tsutakawa (born 1954) is the former Orchestra director at Garfield High School (Seattle, Washington), where he taught from 1985 to 2016.

Born in Seattle, Washington, Tsutakawa attended Franklin High School (Seattle, Washington), a rival of Garfield High School. He began his teaching career as a Japanese teacher, and then began teaching instrumental music in Seattle Public Schools in 1979. He became the Garfield Orchestra director in 1985. Tsutakawa is known to many by the nickname 'Tsut'.

Over the years, he has worked very closely with the award-winning Jazz Band Director Clarence Acox to create one of the best high school music programs in the world. In fact, the Garfield Symphony Orchestra won the "Best Orchestra" Award from the Down Beat Magazine in both 1999 and 2007. In 2016, Seattle mayor Ed Murray declared March 1 official Marcus Tsutukawa Day in Seattle, in recognition of Tsut's 31 years of dedication to the program.

On Wednesday, June 22, 2016, Tsutakawa announced his retirement from Garfield High School (Seattle, Washington). His last day was that Friday.

Tsutakawa was a member of the Board of Directors of the Seattle Symphony from 2003-2007. He is currently the director of the Seattle Youth Symphony Orchestras, which has toured in Europe, Asia and the United States. In 1996, Tsutakawa received the Prix de Martell award, from Martell Cognac, Int'l, recognizing "Champions of Classical Music" (other recipients include Gerard Schwarz, Sir Georg Solti, and others).

Marcus Tsutakawa is the youngest of four children of George and Ayame Tsutakawa. He has two daughters.
