= Broadway High School (Seattle) =

School in Seattle, United States

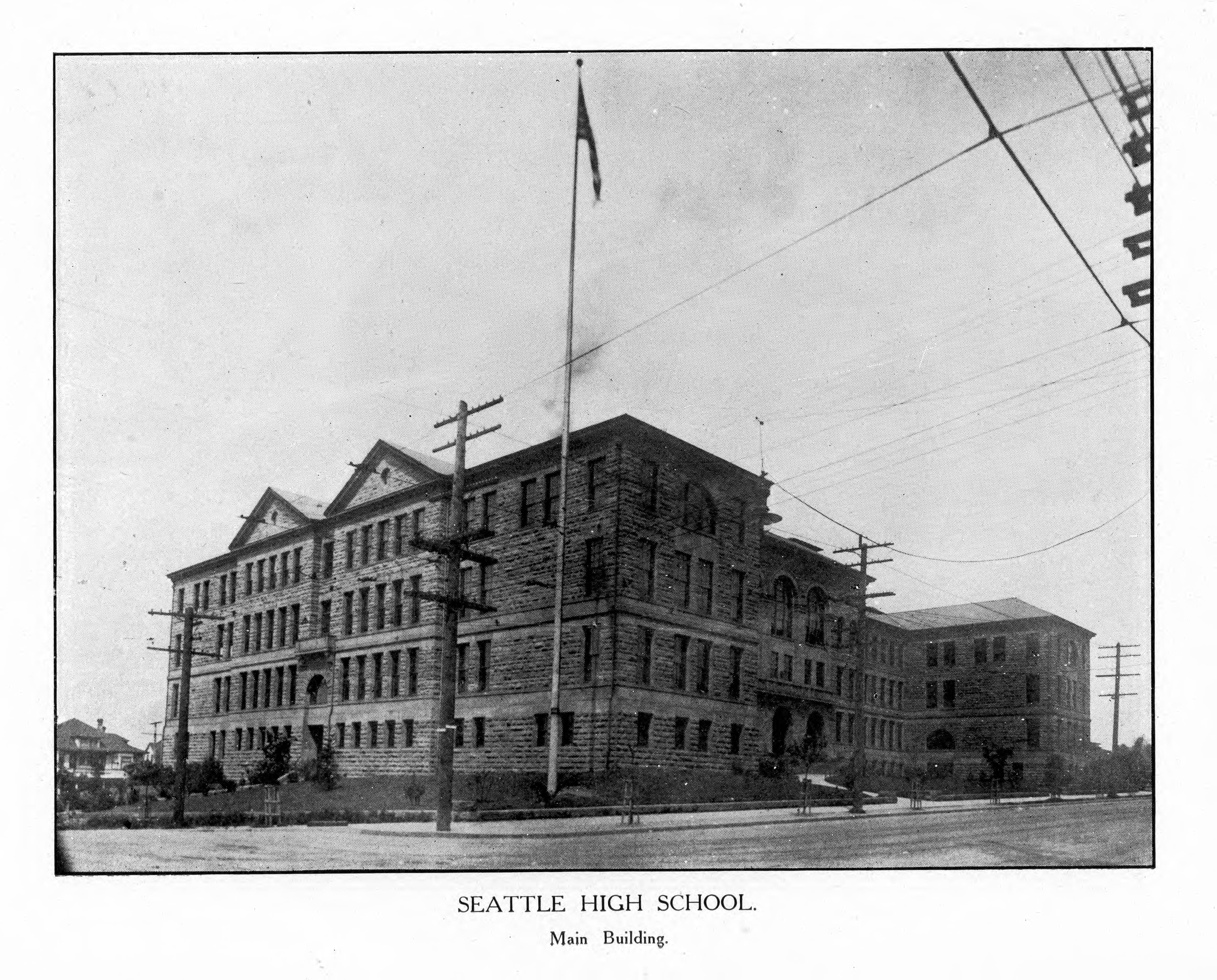

Information
- Former name: Seattle High School; Washington High School
- Established: 1902
- Closed: 1946
- Colors: Black and Orange
- Nickname: Tigers

Broadway High School, originally known as Seattle High School and also briefly known as Washington High School, opened in Seattle, Washington, in 1902 and was the first dedicated high school built in Seattle.

After World War II, the school was converted to a vocational training center for returning soldiers and its remaining high school students were transferred to Lincoln High School and Edison Technical School which shared a campus with Broadway High.

The campus became part of Seattle Community College in 1966, now Seattle Central College. Much of the former school's main building was demolished in the 1970s. A portion was rebuilt as Seattle Central College's Broadway Performance Hall. A video history of the school has been released.

== History ==
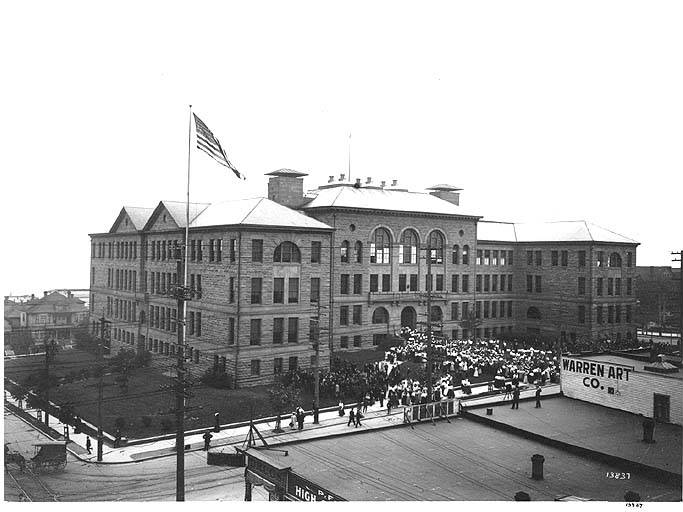
Broadway High School in 1909 in an Asahel Curtis photograph

Broadway High School opened as Seattle High School in 1902 in what is now Seattle's Capitol Hill neighborhood at East Broadway and East Pine Street. Although high school students had been served previously at Seattle's Territorial University and as part of the multi-level Central Schools I and II, Seattle High School was the first dedicated high school built in Seattle. The architects were William E. Boone and J. M. Corner of the firm Boone and Corner. It was one of Boone's last commissions.

The school was renamed to Washington High School in 1906, and then Broadway High School in 1908. Enrollment increased over the years, with the student body reaching 2,368 by the 1936–37 school year. During the school's existence, both its school paper "Whims" and its yearbook "Sealth" won multiple national awards.

Broadway High School had the largest number of Japanese American students of any high school in the city, with Japanese American students comprising about 25 percent of the student body in 1942. The removal of all of these students as part of the Japanese American Internment during World War II had a major impact on the school, and by 1944-45 only 1,216 students were enrolled at Broadway.

Broadway High School's last graduating class was in 1946, after which the building re-opened as Edison Technical College which served the troops returning home from WWII (and in 1966 became Seattle Central College).

In 1974, the majority of the original building, which was in need of significant repairs, was torn down. Through the efforts of the BHS Alumni Association, one part of the building was preserved and is the current site of the Broadway Performance Hall.

Even though the school was closed, the Alumni Foundation & Association remained active, holding annual reunions and providing significant scholarships to SCC students. During the rebuild, alumni rescued a few bags of artifacts found in storage and launched the Broadway High School Archives. Over the years, they amassed a significant collection of artifacts and ephemera including trophies, dance cards, uniforms, letter sweaters, photos and more. In 2014, the Alumni Association disbanded due to aging membership.

The Broadway High School Archives has been preserved by graduate students from University of Washington iSchool and Seattle Central College library as a resource for students, educators, alumni families and genealogists.

== Notable alumni ==
The Seattle High School football team won the national championship in 1906, lead by quarterback and captain William J. Coyle.

- Brock Adams - Congressman and United States Secretary of Transportation
- Kichio Allen Arai - architect who designed several Buddhist temples in the Pacific Northwest
- Alice Ball - chemist who developed the most effective treatment for leprosy during the early 20th century.
- Doris Brougham - Taiwanese educator and Christian missionary.
- Kenneth Callahan - painter and muralist
- Leo Calland - athlete, coach, and San Diego city parks administrator
- Andrew Chinn - artist and art educator
- Fay Chong - artist and educator
- J. Ira Courtney - sprinter who competed at the 1912 Summer Olympics
- William J. Coyle - Quarterback and captain of the University of Washington football team. Elected as eighth Lieutenant Governor of Washington, serving from 1921 to 1925.
- Ky Ebright - coach for the University of California, Berkeley crew
- John Sharpe Griffith - World War I flying ace
- Donald E. Hillman - World War II flying ace
- William Ivey - abstract expressionist painter
- Leo Kenney – abstract painter
- Yu-Tang Daniel Lew - diplomat and ambasador for the Republic of China.
- Ten Million - baseball player
- William W. Momyer - general and commander of the U.S. Air Force Tactical Air Command
- Elmer Nordstrom – businessman, co-president of Nordstrom department store
- Ruth Rappaport - librarian
- John Monk Saunders - novelist, screenwriter, and film director
- Monica Sone - author
- Julius Adams Stratton - electrical engineer, physicist, and university administrator
- Janet Thurlow – jazz singer
- George Tsutakawa - painter and sculptor
- Walter Lyle Voegtlin - gastroenterologist
- Mary Watanabe - actress known as Mary Mon Toy
- Claire Windsor - silent film actress
