= Ruth Rappaport =

Jewish-American librarian (1923–2010)

- Born: May 27, 1923; Leipzig, Germany
- Died: November 17, 2010 (aged 87); Washington, D.C.
- Occupation: Librarian

Ruth Rappaport (May 27, 1923 – November 17, 2010) was a Jewish-American librarian. Her mother's cousin was Helena Rubinstein. Rappaport was born in Leipzig, in Saxony to Mendel and Chaja Rappaport. She had two older half-sisters, Mirjam Rappaport Schneider and Clara Rappaport Rosner. She was a foster child in Zurich in 1938, after running away from her parents when she refused to return to Germany. In 1943 her father died in Buchenwald and her mother probably died in Ravensbrueck.

Rappaport obtained an American visa and went to Seattle in 1938 to live with her uncle, Carl Rubinstein. She graduated from Broadway High School.

== Biography ==
In 1948, she lived in Jerusalem and worked briefly as a photographer for Acme News, then became a photograph archivist for the Foreign Press Office of the new state of Israel in Tel Aviv until the end of 1949. She then moved to New York and worked for lawyer Max Lowenthal and assisted him with the publication of his book, The Federal Bureau of Investigation, in 1950. She moved to Berkeley in 1951 and earned her undergraduate degree in sociology and her master's degree in librarianship from the University of California. In 1959 she began working for the U.S. Air Force, and as such managed a library at Naha Air Base in Okinawa.

== Career ==
In 1963, she began managing the military libraries in Saigon for the U.S. Navy, agreeing to do so only if there would be no censorship. In 1966 the U.S. Army took over those libraries, but Rappaport stayed. While in Vietnam she supervised the library system as it grew from a few books to 39 branch libraries and 117 field collections. Rappaport quit her position with the Army in 1970.

After this she worked at the Library of Congress for twenty-three years, beginning in 1970; her first assignment there was to help re-catalog books in the Delta collection, which was a collection of pornography and erotica confiscated by the FBI and kept in a locked cage. Its contents are now integrated with the rest of the collections. In the mid-1970s she and other catalogers worked to start the Library of Congress Professional Guild (AFSCME Local 2910), because they felt that managers were demanding unreasonable quotas of books cataloged per day.

In 2006 she became a founding member of Capitol Hill Village, an organization created to help seniors age in place.

She was also a founding member of the Hill Havurah on Capitol Hill.

Most of her papers are held at the United States Holocaust Memorial Museum; there is also the Ruth Rappaport Collection at the U.S. Army Heritage and Education Center and "Ruth Rappaport papers, 1946-1957" at the University of Washington Special Collections.

== Awards and recognition ==
The Ruth Rappaport Wisdom Award was created "to recognize the work of one individual annually that has displayed remarkable warmth, wisdom, and commitment to the Capitol Hill Community." It is awarded by Everyone Home DC (formerly Capitol Hill Group Ministry).

She died in 2010.

She has a memorial bench located in Congressional Cemetery.

The Ruth Rappaport photograph collection is in the Special Collections of the University of Washington Libraries.

In 2019, Kate Stewart published a biography of Rappaport, A Well-Read Woman: The Life, Loves, and Legacy of Ruth Rappaport (Little A).

== Other resources ==
- The United States Holocaust Memorial Museum Oral History Branch interview with Ruth Rappaport (2010)
- The United States Holocaust Memorial Museum Ruth Rappaport papers
