= Kamekichi Tokita =

American painter

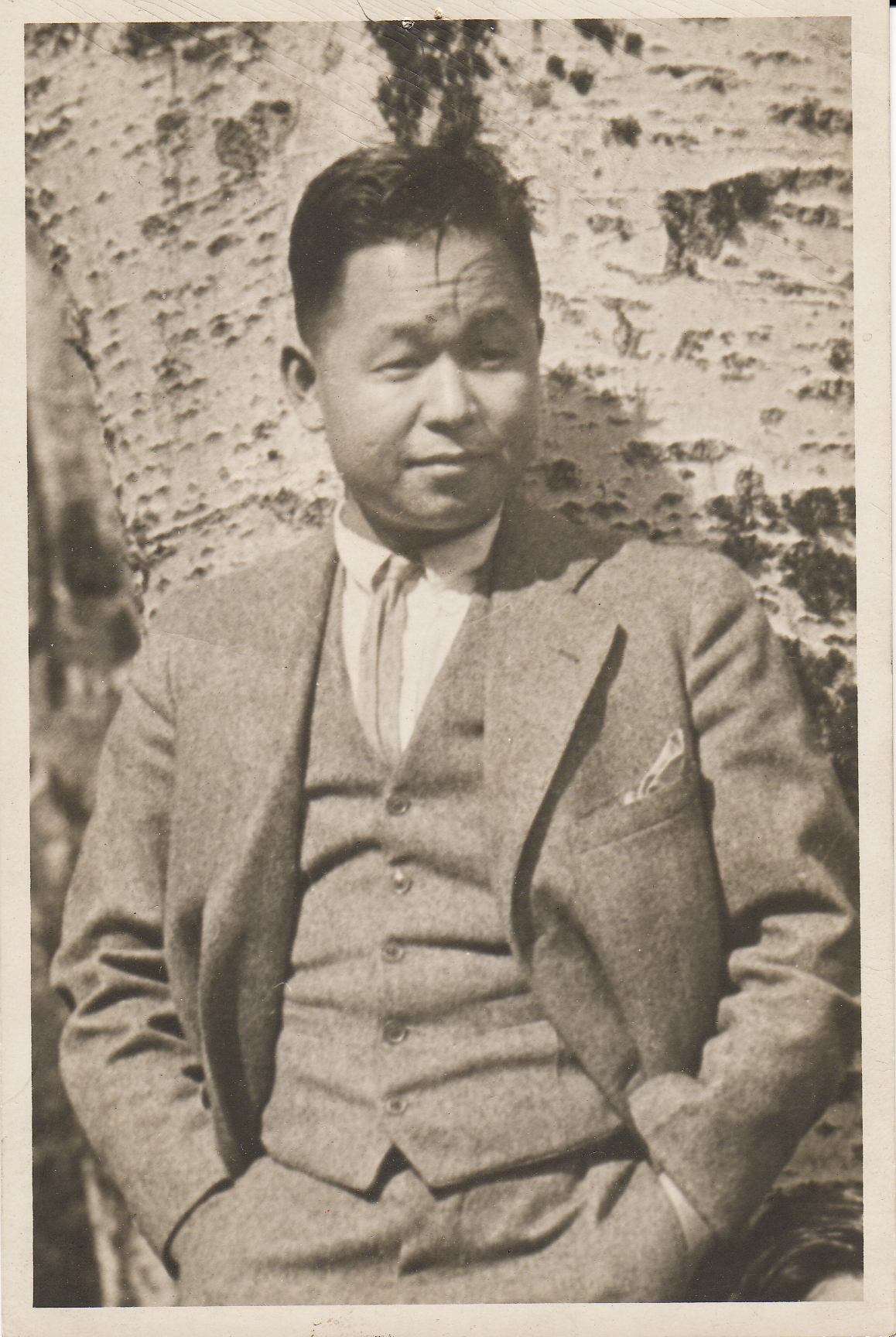
Kamekichi Tokita, artist (1897 – 1948)

Kamekichi Tokita (1897–1948) was a Japanese American painter and diarist. He immigrated to the United States from Japan in 1919, and lived in Seattle, Washington's Japantown/Nihonmachi district (later known as the International District). He was a prominent figure in the Pacific Northwest art world of the 1930s, with paintings regularly included in major exhibitions.

During World War II, Tokita and his family were forced to move to the Minidoka Relocation Center in Idaho. His detailed, deeply expressive diary and sketches he made there were later published and recognized as important records of the Japanese American wartime experience.

Tokita died in Seattle in 1948.

== Early life in Japan ==
Tokita was born July 16, 1897, in the coastal city of Shizuoka, Shizuoka Prefecture, to Juhei Tokita and Shin Kato Tokita. He had an older brother, Wahei, and three younger sisters. His father, Juhei, owned a soy sauce manufacturing business and ran a family-owned dry tea shop. As in many middle-class families of the Meiji Era, great importance was placed on both traditional Japanese values and modern, Western-style education.

Tokita showed an interest in art from an early age, but was expected to work in the family business. After graduating from high school in 1915 his father sent him to China (the exact location is unrecorded) to work as a tea salesman, but he instead spent much of his two years there studying calligraphy and traditional ink painting under a Chinese teacher.

Exasperated by his son's growing rebelliousness, Tokita's father planned to send him to work with business associates in Chicago, Illinois, in the United States. Tokita sailed the Yokohama-Seattle line aboard the Suwa Maru, arriving in Seattle, Washington on December 2, 1919. He was greeted by his brother Wahei, who had been living and working in Seattle for several years. Enamored of the city and its thriving Japantown district, Tokita did not continue on to Chicago.

== In the U.S., 1920s ==
Bridge, Kamekichi Tokita, 1931. Seattle Art Museum, copyright Kamekichi Tokita.

Little detail is known of Tokita's early years in Seattle. His brother returned to Japan about a year after Tokita's arrival. Around the same time, he met Kenjiro Nomura, a fellow Issei (first-generation Japanese immigrant) painter who became his close friend and business partner, and who introduced him to oil painting. Tokita began working as a sign painter, a trade in which his skill at calligraphy proved useful.

Both Seattle's and Nihonmachi's arts communities were vibrant and growing quickly in the 1920s, and—despite some hostility toward Japanese immigrants in the larger community— ties were formed between the two. The city's mainstream art institutions regularly exhibited works by Japanese American artists, while celebrated artists such as Morris Graves, Kenneth Callahan, and Mark Tobey would become known for the inspiration of Japan's and Asia's artists, poets, and philosophers.

While his skill as a sign painter was a source of income, his oil paintings headed in a very different direction. He painted scenes of the world around him—houses, apartment buildings, stores, streets, bridges, the waterfront—using bold outlines and subtle valuation of earthen tones. With his friend Nomura and others he at times ventured into the countryside to paint rural scenes, but most of his still-extant paintings show urban scenes of the city where he lived and worked. Because of his vernacular subject matter and realist approach he came to be associated with the American Scene painters, but unlike many of them he rarely painted human forms.

There are indications Tokita's work was displayed as early as 1924 in Japantown, but his first real notice came in 1928, when his painting Yeslerway was included in the First Northwest Independent Salon. That same year, he became Kenjiro Nomura's partner at the Noto Sign Co., whose building at Sixth and Main, in the heart of Japantown, served as their workshop, home, studio, and salon. There they communed with Japanese American artists such as George Tsutakawa, Paul Horiuchi, and Takuichi Fujii.

The impact of the Great Depression, which began the following year, was muted at first. Still-solvent backers allowed the arts to continue to thrive in Seattle. After a competitor opted to close shop and return to Japan, Noto became the only sign company serving the Asian community.

== Career, 1930s ==
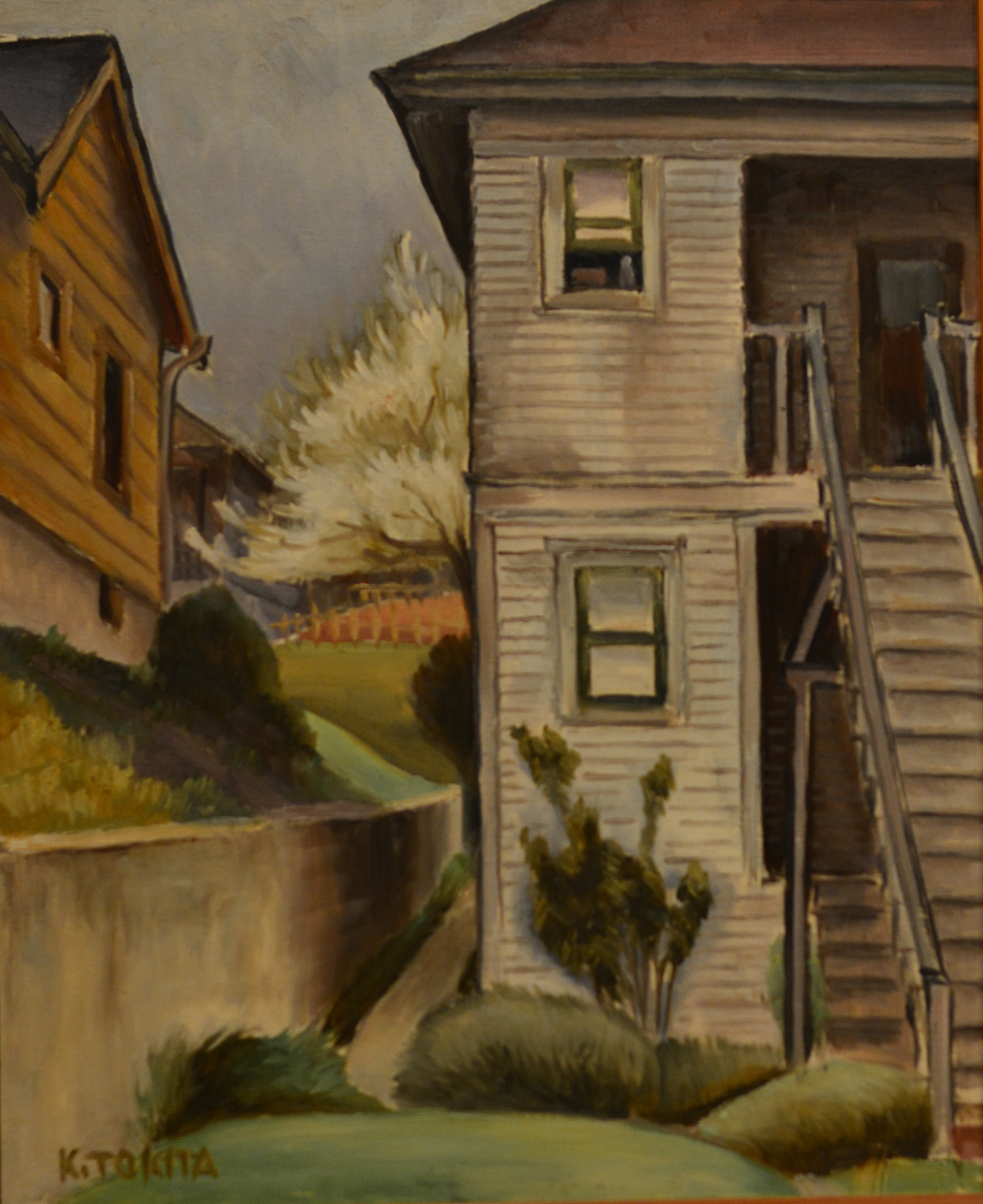
Kamekichi Tokita, Backyard, 1934

Tokita's period of greatest activity and acclaim lasted from about 1929 to 1936. His work appeared regularly in Annual Exhibitions in Seattle, San Francisco, and Oakland, and was displayed in solo shows. He was encouraged and supported by, among others, the Seattle Art Museum, the Henry Art Gallery, and artist/critic Kenneth Callahan, who described Tokita as "the leader of the Japanese painters in Seattle".

On January 24, 1932, Tokita married Haruko Suzuki, who, though ten years younger than he, had also immigrated to the U.S. in 1919. Tokita moved out of the Noto Sign Co. building. Starting with a son born in 1934, the couple would have eight children over the next twelve years.

In 1935, at Callahan's urging, Tokita joined the Group of Twelve, a progressive artists' collective which held several successful exhibitions. In 1936 his work appeared in four Group of Twelve shows, the 22nd Northwest Annual at the Seattle Art Museum, and the First National Exhibition of American Art at the Rockefeller Center Gallery in New York.

Despite his successes, the pressures of the Great Depression were unavoidable. Tokita created six oil paintings for the federal Public Works of Art Program, one of which was shown in the PWAP's 1934 National Exhibition at the Corcoran Gallery of Art in Washington, D.C. In 1936, slow business forced Tokita and Nomura to close down their sign painting shop. Tokita then became manager/operator of the Cadillac Hotel at Second and Jackson Streets, just outside Japantown, while continuing as a freelance sign painter. With two time-consuming jobs and a growing family, his fine art production dropped off quickly.

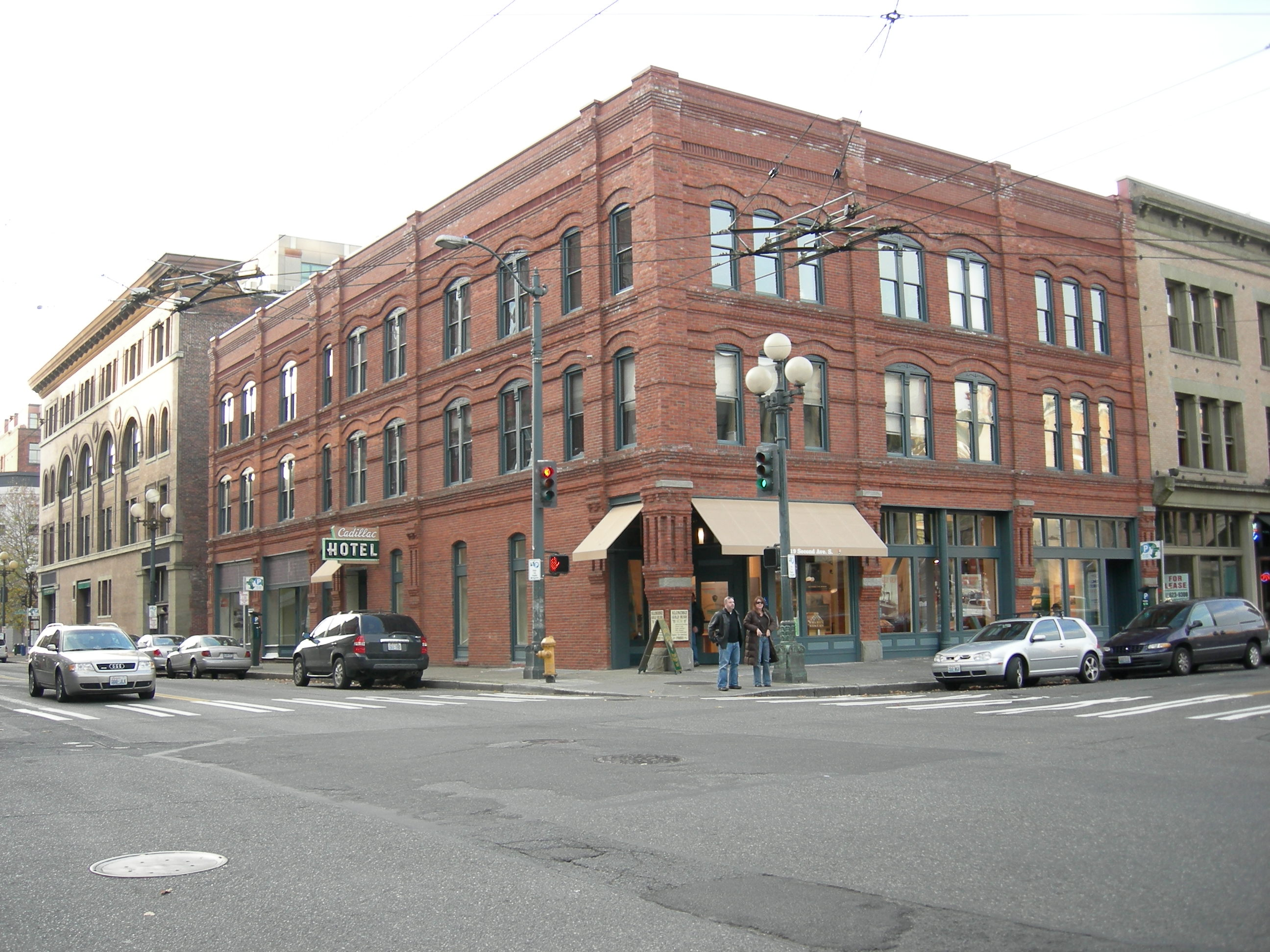
The preserved Cadillac Hotel in Seattle's Pioneer Square district. Photo: Joe Mabel.

Tokita and his family lived in cramped quarters at the hotel, but managed to weather the Great Depression fairly well. Tokita bought a car, and took his kids on weekend trips to parks and the countryside. He competed in kyūdō (ritualized traditional archery) tournaments and was an active participant in community events and celebrations. With his family he was a strict disciplinarian and traditionalist who allowed only Japanese to be spoken at home, but was relaxed and good-humored in larger settings. By the late 1930s, he appears to have ceased painting fine art almost entirely.

== Wartime relocation ==
Although their children were Nisei, and therefore U.S. citizens, Tokita and his wife, as Issei, were legally barred from becoming citizens, and were classified as resident aliens.

On December 7, 1941, Japanese forces attacked Pearl Harbor. A few weeks later, President Franklin D. Roosevelt issued Executive Order 9066, which authorized the military to declare the West Coast a military zone from which all persons of Japanese descent, including Nisei, were to be removed. After months of uncertainty, the Tokitas had to sell their hotel business and many of their belongings. They spent the summer of 1942 crowded into the Puyallup Assembly Center (a converted fairgrounds near Seattle), and were then transported to the Minidoka Relocation Center in Idaho, where they lived for the next three years. Tokita's young son Shokichi (b. 1933) later recalled that there were "barbed wires all around the camp... [and] towers on all three sides of the camp, and soldiers... guarding us all day and night".

Tokita worked as a maintenance man and sign painter in the camp. Finally having time, he began sketching and painting again, creating oil-on-masonite works in a contemporary style, and also pencil sketches in traditional Japanese style. He, Kenjiro Nomura, and Takuichi Fujii were featured in art shows at the camp.

Tokita began keeping a diary on December 7, 1941, and the entries are often surprising, revealing the complexity of the times for an Issei man. More so than any other memoirist, he captures the uncertainty of the five months between Pearl Harbor and the beginning of the forced relocation, in which the Nikkei were buffeted by physical and legal threats, contradictory orders, rumors, and intense anxiety. Tokita, though no threat to the security of his adopted country, is understanding of Japan's war aims, proud of its military prowess, dismissive of both Axis and Allied propaganda, and thankful for the humane actions of individual whites. He reveals the rivalry — amplified by the close quarters of the camps — between older, conservative Issei and brash, energetic Nisei. He resents the suffering of his family in temperatures ranging from near zero to over a hundred, but appreciates the beauty of the surrounding landscape, a desert moonrise leaving him awestruck. His diaries were translated from old-style Japanese and first published in 2011.

== Final years ==
With the war's end in 1945, the Tokitas, now with seven children, rather hesitantly moved back to Seattle. For all the hardship and primitive, crowded conditions at Minidoka, it had, after three years, become their home — free of charge, in a stable, known community. Back in Seattle, they found that even the name 'Japantown' had generally been dropped in favor of 'Chinatown'.

Unable to find housing, an old family friend, Father Leopold Tibesar, arranged for them to live with several other returnee families in a classroom of the local Japanese language school. There the family lived for two years, with communal kitchen and bathrooms, sleeping on army cots, just as they had at Minidoka. Tokita resumed work as a sign painter, but, suffering from undiagnosed diabetes, appeared to have lost some of his former drive.

Their eighth child, a daughter, was born in 1946, and the following year, mainly through Haruko's effort, they purchased operation and management of the New Lucky Hotel in Chinatown. It was essentially a flophouse in dilapidated condition, but they set to work repairing and upgrading it.

In 1948, Tokita was hospitalized with blindness, kidney failure, and numbness of limbs - all symptoms of advanced diabetes. He eventually returned home, but on October 7, at age 51, he had a heart attack and died.

== Legacy ==
Over the years, much of Tokita's work is believed to have been lost or destroyed. Of his forty-one known extant paintings, several are in the permanent collections of museums, and his work has been exhibited at the Seattle Art Museum, the Tacoma Art Museum, the Portland Art Museum, and the Wing Luke Museum. Paintings of his were included in 1994's The View from Within: Japanese American Art from the Internment Camps, 1942-1945 at the Japanese American National Museum, in Los Angeles; and in 1995's Japanese and Japanese American Painters in the United States, 1896-1945: A Half Century of Hope and Suffering, which showed in Japan at Tokyo Metropolitan Teien Art Museum, Oita Prefectural Art Hall, and the Hiroshima Museum of Art.
