= The Seattle Mural =

Artwork by Paul Horiuchi in Seattle, Washington, U.S.

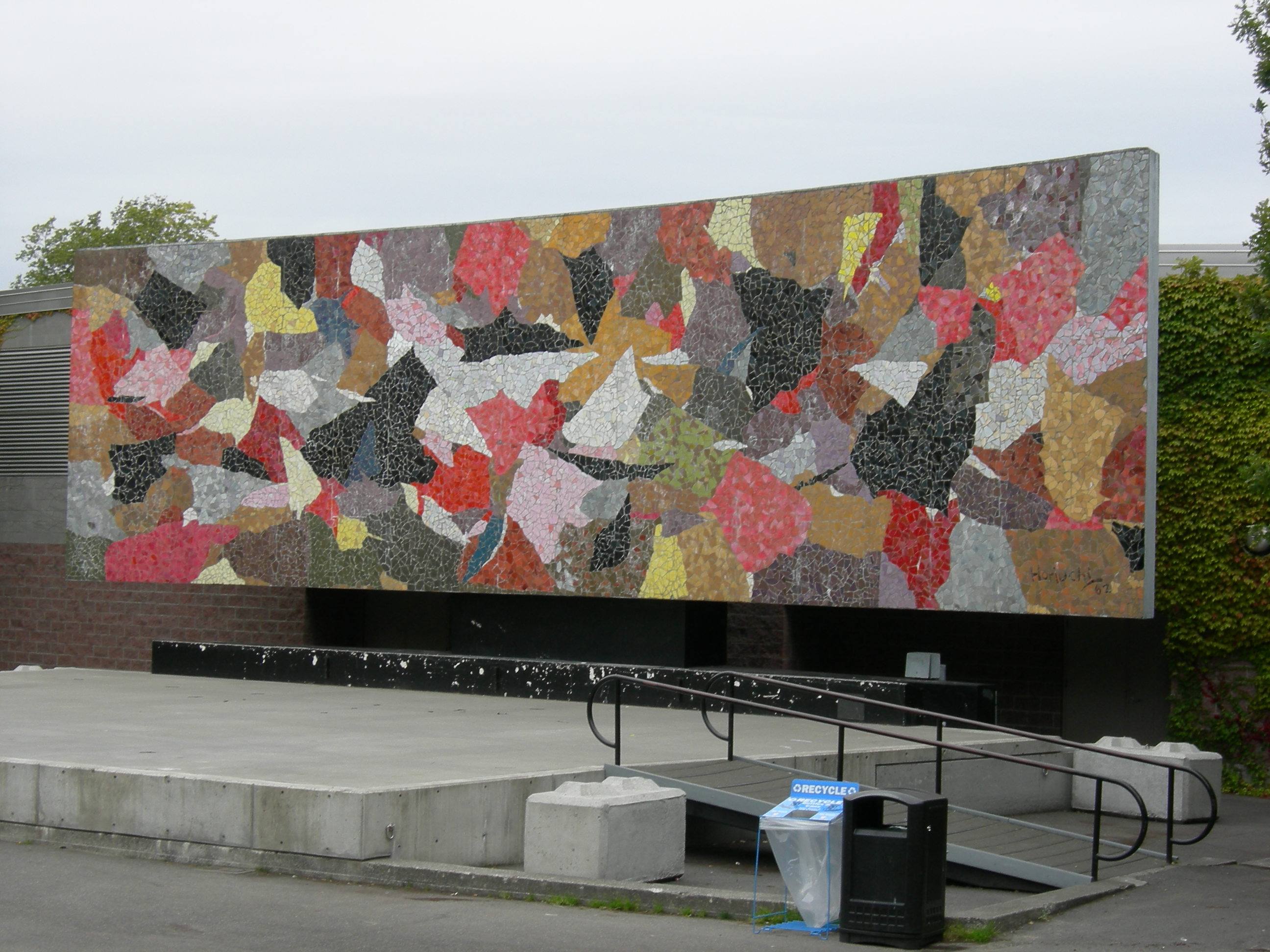
- The mural in 2006
- Artist: Paul Horiuchi
- Year: 1962
- Location: Seattle, Washington, U.S.
- 47.6205°N 122.3507°W

The Seattle Mural (sometimes referred to as the "Horiuchi Mural") is a mural by Paul Horiuchi at the Seattle Center, in Seattle, Washington. It was commissioned for the 1962 Century 21 Exposition and was billed as the largest artwork in the Pacific Northwest. The mural measures 60 feet by 17 feet.

It was originally installed over a reflecting pool and now serves as a backdrop for Mural Amphitheatre, an outdoor film and performance venue that has hosted numerous musical events. The venue also hosted KING-TV's weekly program Seattle Center Hootenanny.

Horiuchi traveled to Venice to prepare for the mural. A restoration of the mural was completed in 2011. It is a designated landmark.

== See also ==
- List of Seattle landmarks
