= Fay Chong =

Chinese-American painter

- Fay Chong painting on beach, La Push, Washington, ca.1961. Wing Luke Asian Museum Photograph Collection
- Born: June 28, 1912; Canton, China
- Died: February 1973 (aged 60); Seattle, Washington, U.S.
- Education: University of Washington
- Years active: c. 1929 – 1973
- Known for: Printmaking, Watercolor painting
- Movement: WPA-era artist
- Spouse: Priscilla Hwang

Fay Chong (1912–1973) was a Chinese-American artist and educator, well known for his printmaking and watercolor painting. He was also known for his activities as an arts organizer, arts educator and WPA-era artist. Chong was active in the Pacific Northwest.

== Early life and education ==
Fay Chong was born in Canton (modern Guangzhou), China in 1912, and moved to Seattle with his family in 1920. He attended public school, and studied art with Hannah Jones at Broadway High School, along with classmates Morris Graves and George Tsutakawa. He studied traditional calligraphy techniques during return visits to China in 1929 and 1935.

== Career ==
In 1933, Chong, Andrew Chinn, Lawrence Yun, Yippie Eng, and others formed the Chinese Arts Club. Initially an informal co-op, they began holding regular shows at a shared studio in Seattle's International District, and eventually exhibited as an arts collective at the New York Chinese School. Artists Guy Anderson and William Cumming – who, along with Graves and Mark Tobey, would later become prominent members of the 'Northwest School' – were regular guests, joining them on art-making field excursions.

Cannery Buildings, 1936, b&w block print by Fay Chong.

In 1938, during the Great Depression, Morris Graves helped Chong find work as an artist with the Federal Art Project of the Works Project Administration. He worked with the WPA, off and on, until 1942, mainly making linocut prints for various federal buildings and public places. He also became interested in watercolor painting at this time.

After the WPA, Chong worked various jobs, including several years at a YMCA school. In the mid-1950s – already a well-known, nationally exhibited "WPA artist" – he enrolled at the University of Washington, studying under Mark Tobey and others. He earned his B.A. degree in 1968, and M.A. degree at University of Washington in Arts Education in 1971. He taught art at Cornish College of the Arts, Seattle Central College, Washington Senior High School, and Ingraham High School.

George Town Farm, 1939 watercolor by Fay Chong.

His artwork fused traditional Chinese styles with American Regionalism and other modern developments. His later work incorporated elements of Abstract expressionism. His art has been exhibited at the Seattle Art Museum, the Frye Art Museum, the Zoe Dusanne Gallery, and the Francine Seders Gallery in Seattle; the Tacoma Art Museum, the Bellevue Arts Museum, Reed College in Portland, Oregon, the Santa Barbara Museum of Art in California, the Riverside Gallery in New York City, and in many other museums and galleries.

He was a member of the arts organizations Northwest Printmakers (treasurer and president), the Northwest Watercolor Society (president), the Puget Sound Group of Painters, and the Washington Art Association.

Chong married artist Priscilla Hwang. The two exhibited together at the annual Bellevue Arts and Crafts Fair for many years.

Fay Chong died of a stroke in 1973, aged 60. His work is in many public museum art collections, including the Smithsonian American Art Museum, the National Gallery of Art, the Tacoma Art Museum, the Art Institute of Chicago, and the Seattle Arts Museum, among other venues.
