= Joshua Green Fountain =

Fountain and sculpture in Seattle, Washington, U.S.

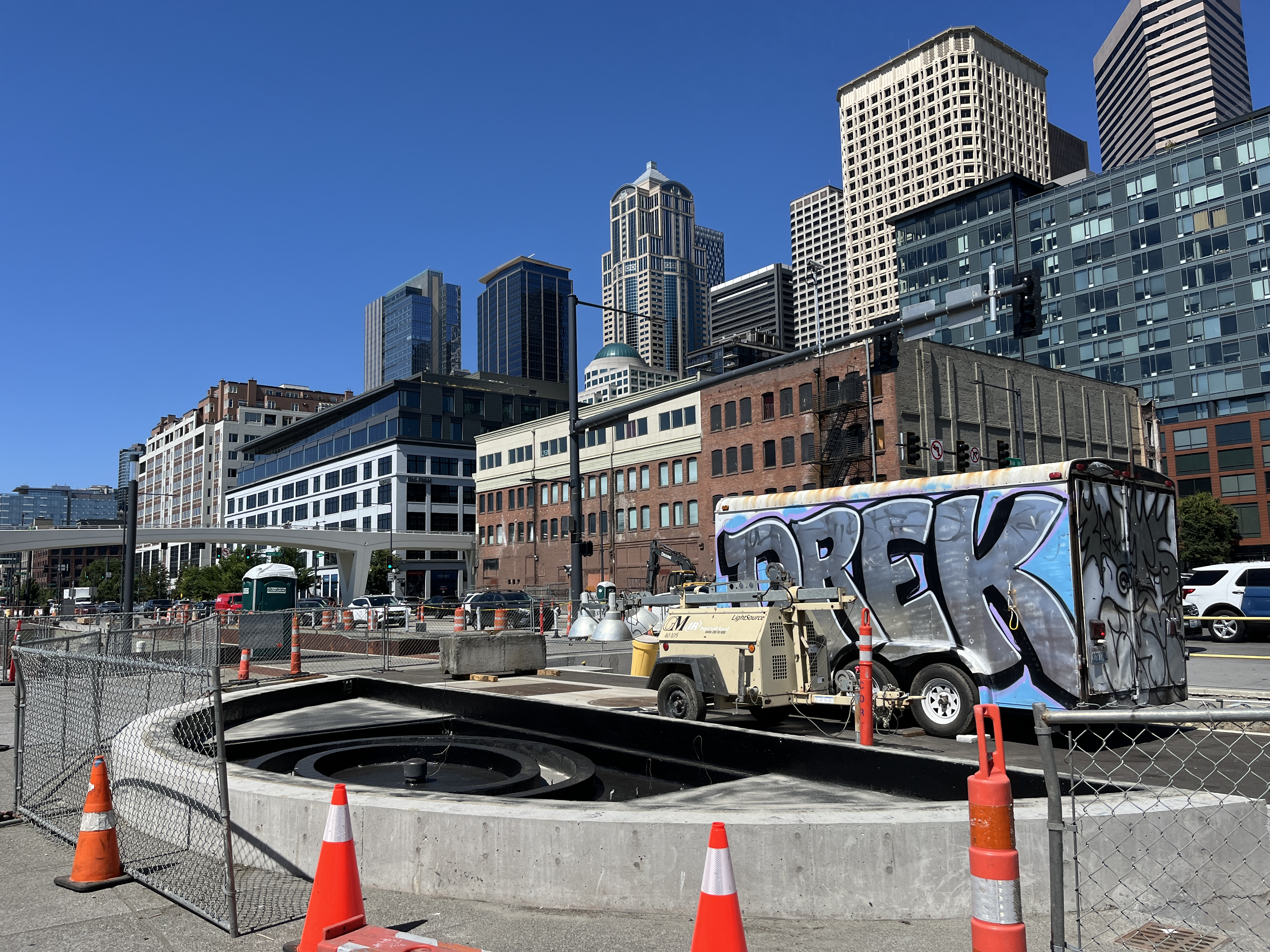
- The fountain under construction in 2024
- Location: Seattle, Washington, U.S.
- 47°36′8.4″N 122°20′13.8″W

Joshua Green Fountain is a fountain by George Tsutakawa, installed in Seattle, Washington. Originally installed at Colman Dock in 1966, the fountain was removed when the Washington State Department of Transportation and Washington State Ferries started renovating the ferry terminal. The fountain was reinstalled along the Waterfront Park Promenade at Columbia Street in 2025.
