= Ky Ebright =

American crew coach (1894–1979)

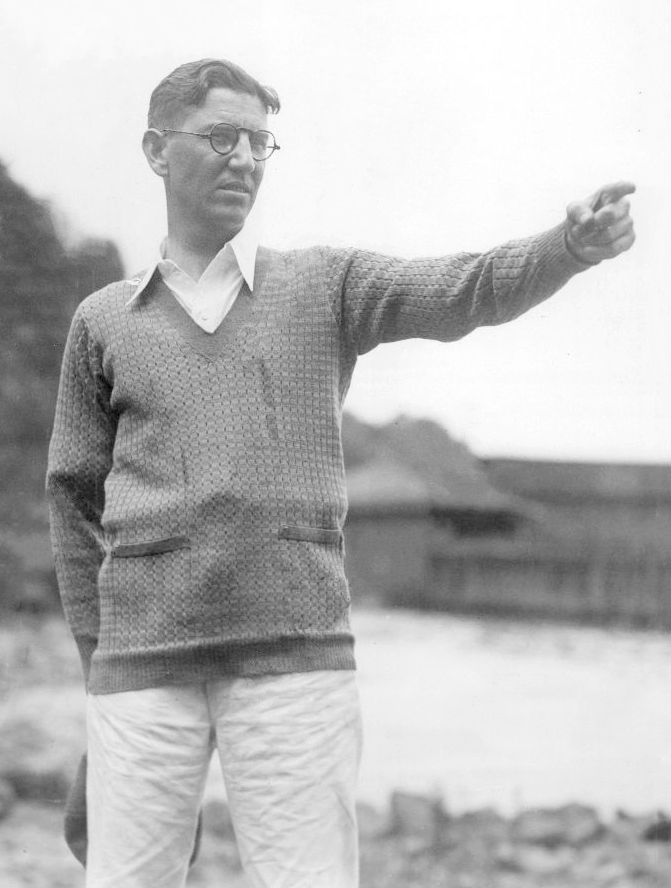
Ebright in 1930

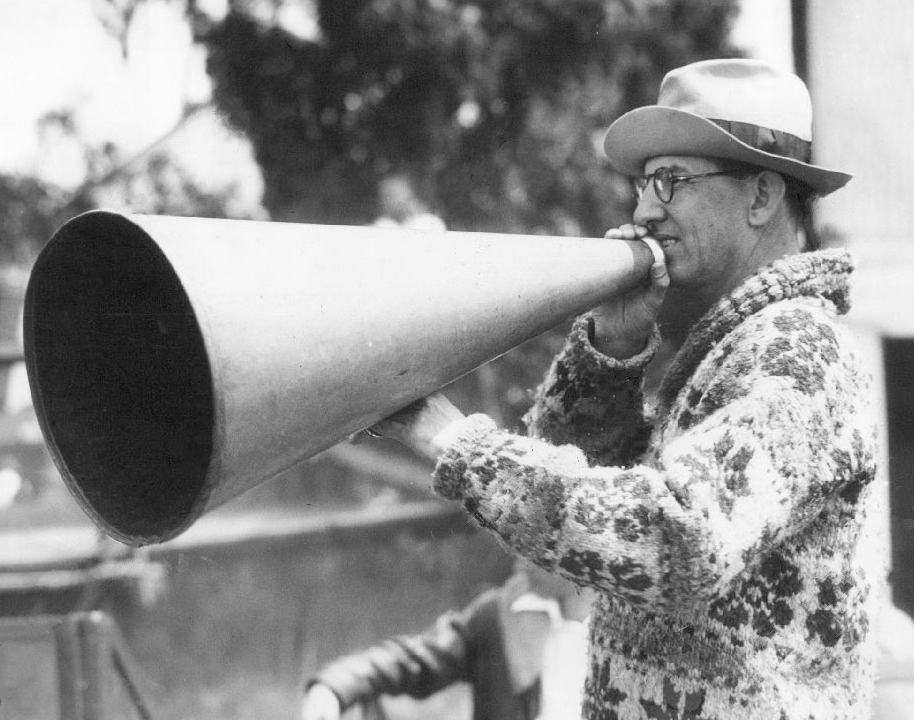
Ebright in 1931

Carroll M. "Ky" Ebright (March 20, 1894 – November 25, 1979) was a revered coach for the University of California, Berkeley crew.

== Early life and education ==
Ebright was an only child, born in Chicago, Illinois, to Frank Randall Ebright and Charlotte M. Bassage Ebright. He attended Broadway High School in Seattle, Washington.

While attending college at the University of Washington, Ebright was a coxswain, lettering there in 1916 and 1917.

During World War I he was a flying instructor.

== Career ==
Ebright remained at the University of Washington after graduating and was an assistant coach there through the 1923 season. In the fall of 1923, he became the head coach for the rowing team at Berkeley. Ebright took the job only after he was assured that his job at Washington would be waiting for him if things did not work well.

Ebright is the only man to have coached three Olympic gold medal-winning eight-oared boats. He coached the Cal men's crew from 1924 through 1959.

During his tenure, the Cal Bears men's varsity 8 (8+) won the following events:

Olympics

- 1928 Summer Olympics – Gold Medal
- 1932 Summer Olympics – Gold Medal
- 1948 Summer Olympics – Gold Medal

IRA Championships – National Title

- 1928
- 1932
- 1934
- 1935
- 1939
- 1949

In 1956, Ebright was inducted into the United States Rowing Hall of Fame. In addition, four of his varsity boats have been inducted:

- 1928 Univ. California Eight
- 1932 Univ. California Eight
- 1939 Univ. California Eight
- 1948 Univ. California Eight

== Personal life ==
According to friend and interviewer Arthur Arlett, Ebright was small of stature (befitting a coxswain) and was affectionately nicknamed "The Little Admiral". He married Kathryn Doty Gruber Ebright; their families were friendly and were neighbors. They had two children.

On November 25, 1979, Ebright died in Berkeley, California, at the age of 85. In 1996, Gregory Peck, one of Ebright's former students, donated $25,000 to the rowing crew in honor of his coach.
