= Ten Million =

American minor league baseball player (1889–1964)

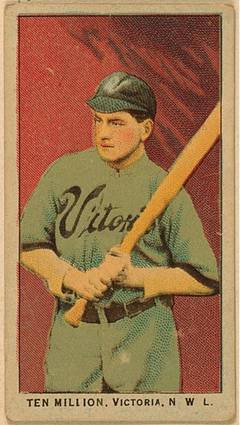
Ten Million on a 1911 baseball card

Ten Million (October 14, 1889 – June 18, 1964) was an American minor league baseball player who played for various teams in the Northwestern League in the years prior to World War I. He is best known for his unusual name.

== Baseball career ==
The Cleveland Naps acquired Million's contract in 1911 but he never got to play a major league game due to a knee injury. Million played for the Tacoma Tigers from 1912 to 1914, where in the last two season he played under Hall of Famer Joe McGinnity. Million also played with the Seattle, Victoria, and Spokane teams of the Northwestern League. His career was brought to an end by a knee injury.

== The Obak ==
Between 1909 and 1911, Obak cigarettes issued a series of baseball cards in order to promote their product. The card series, identified by The American Card Catalog as T212, was printed and distributed in a manner similar to that of the American Tobacco Companies' T206 set.

Million appeared in the 1911 issue while playing for the Victoria baseball team. The T212 issue was one of only two series to feature Million on one of its cards. The other series, T4, was a cabinet card also printed by Obak Cigarettes.

== Personal life ==
Million was born in Mount Vernon, Washington, and attended the University of Washington (UW). Million's paternal grandmother wanted her grandson's name to stand out, and suggested the name Ten. She was a persuasive figure in his life, as she convinced his wife to name their daughter "Decillian," by bribing her with 50 dollars. (Note: The daughter picked up the nickname Dixie in her childhood, which she used in her adult life)

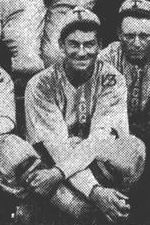

Million attended Broadway High School, and graduated in 1908. He went on to college at UW. After his playing days, he stayed close to home and moved to Seattle. There, he worked for the city as a claims adjuster. After leaving that position, he began working for the local Spalding Sporting Goods store, where he met his future wife, Christine. During his downtime, Million refereed in games for high school baseball, football, and basketball.
