= Naramore Fountain =

Artwork by George Tsutakawa in Seattle, Washington, U.S.

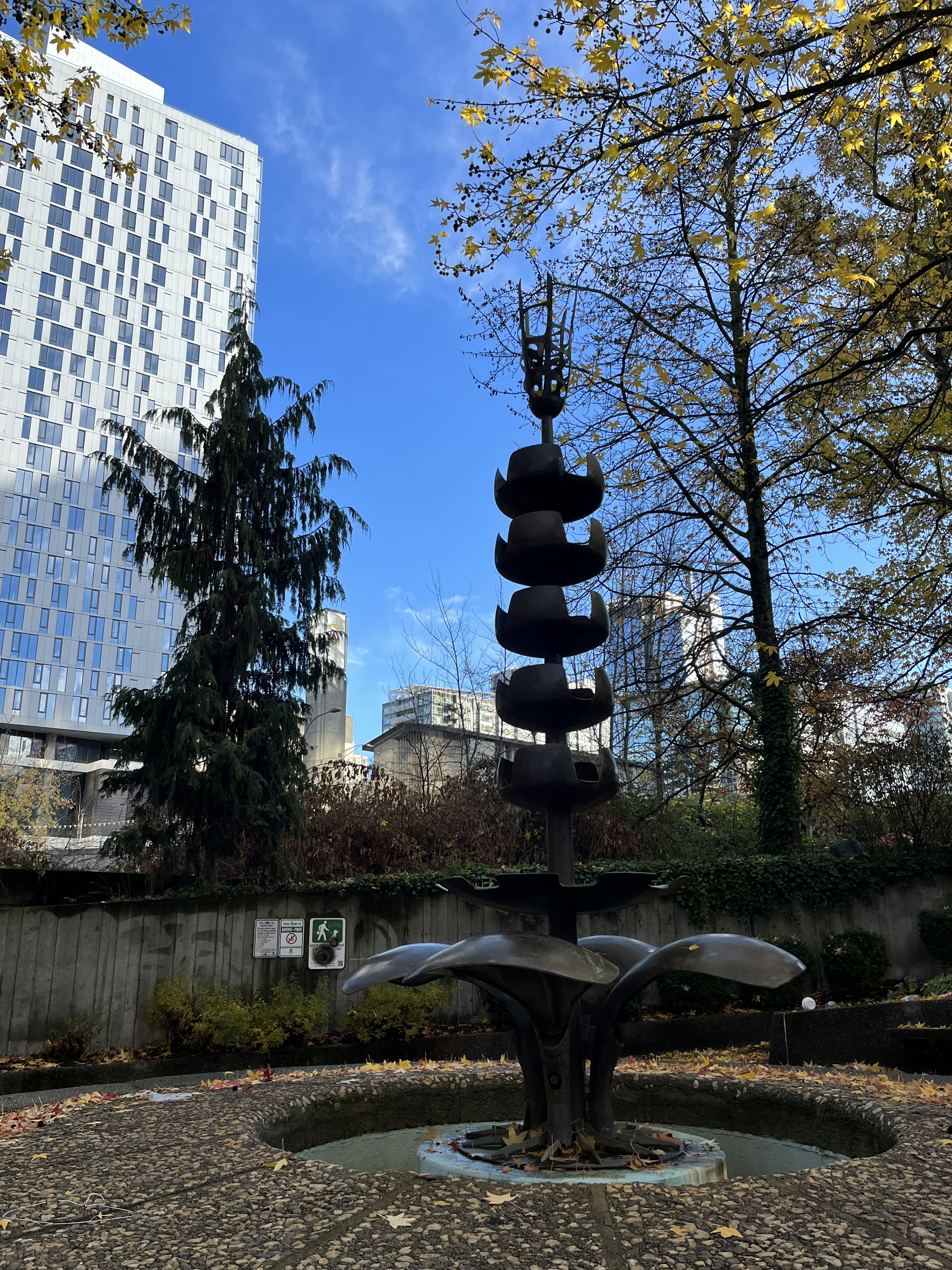
- The fountain in 2022
- Artist: George Tsutakawa
- Location: Seattle, Washington, U.S.; 47°36′29.9″N 122°19′54.1″W

Naramore Fountain is a fountain and sculpture by George Tsutakawa, installed in Seattle.

According to HistoryLink, the work "was unusual in its display: The fountain was placed above eye level on a concave platform of rocks quarried from the Cascade Mountains, which gave the effect of a flowing mountain stream."

The fountain was donated to the city by architect Floyd A. Naramore, who is also the fountain's namesake.<ref name=":0" / Based on Google Street View observation, the bronze structure was removed sometime between July 2024 and August 2025. As of August 2026, a sculpture of two flowers seemingly made of scrap material and painted in primary colors sits in its place. The artist is unknown. It is unclear whether this was a formal installment by the city or a guerilla art installation.>
