= Centennial Fountain (Seattle University) =

Fountain in Seattle, Washington, U.S.

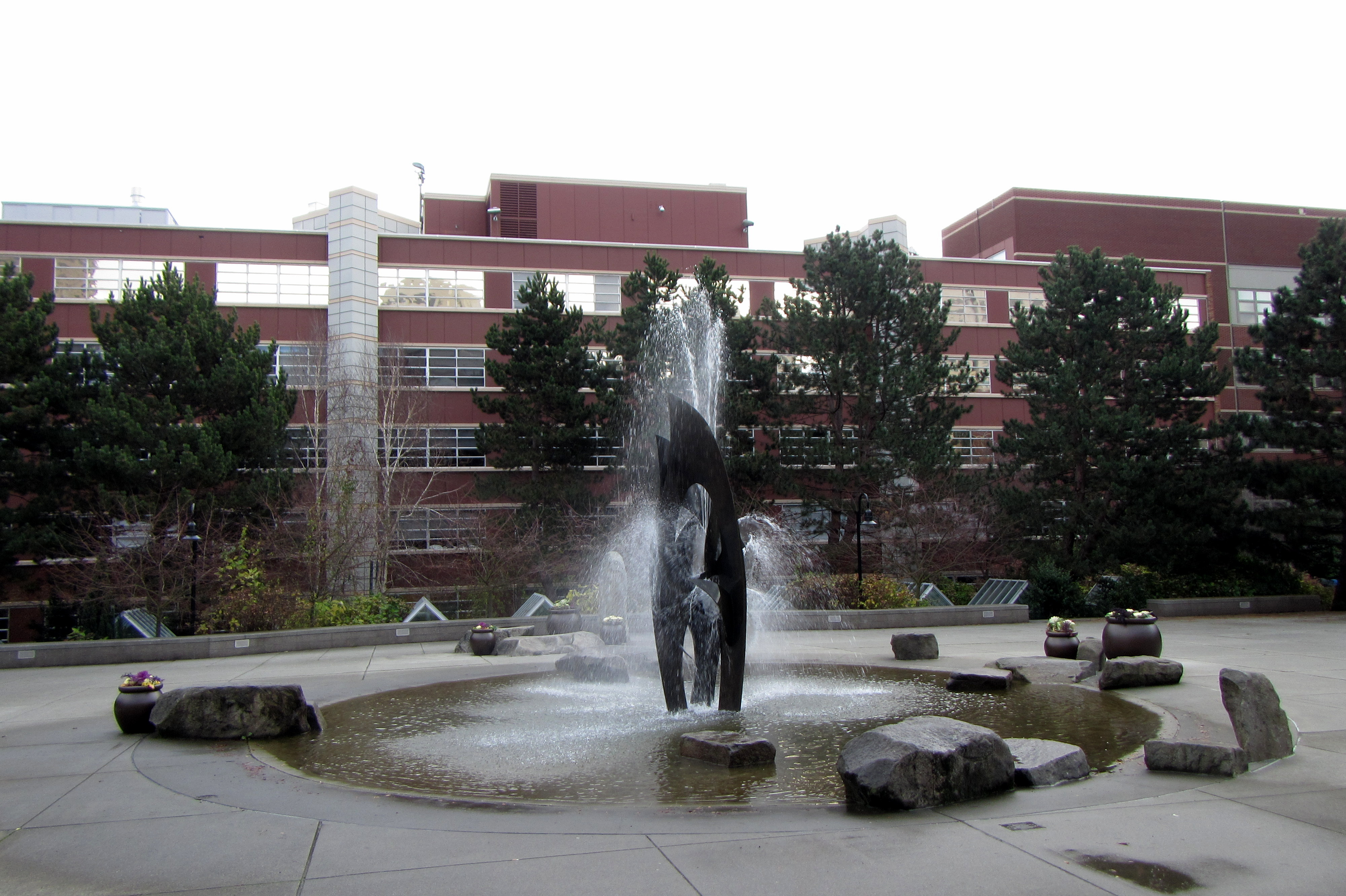
- The fountain in 2012
- Artist: George Tsutakawa
- Year: 1989
- Location: Seattle, Washington, U.S.
- 47°36′36″N 122°19′08″W

Centennial Fountain is a fountain at the Seattle University campus by George Tsutakawa, in Seattle, Washington. The fountain was installed in 1989.

== See also ==
- 1989 in art
