= Fountain of Wisdom =

Fountain and sculpture in Seattle, Washington, U.S.

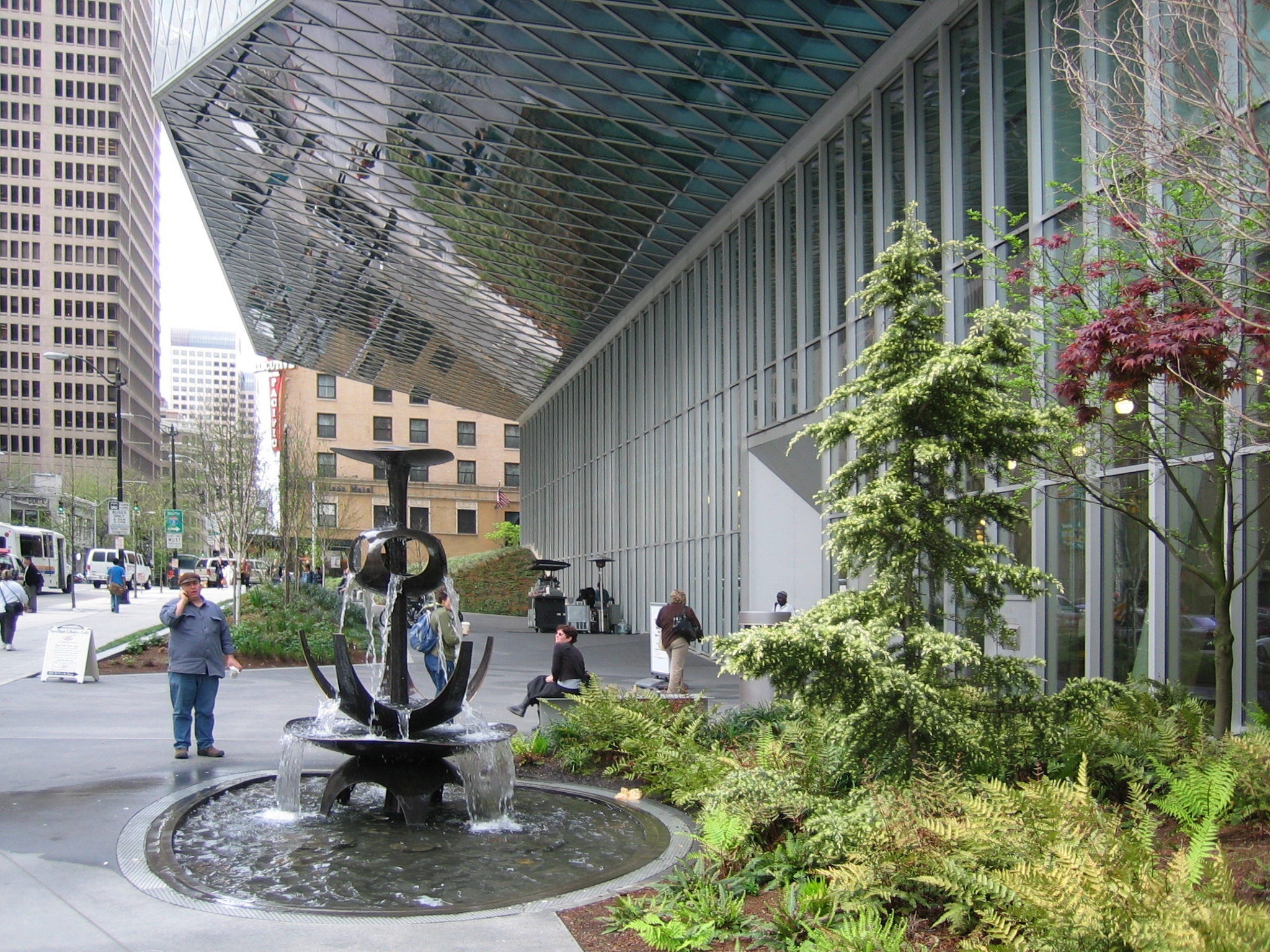
- The fountain in 2006
- Artist: George Tsutakawa
- Location: Seattle, Washington, U.S.
- 47°36′22.6″N 122°19′58.4″W

Fountain of Wisdom is a fountain and sculpture by George Tsutakawa, installed out the Seattle Central Library, in the U.S. state of Washington.
