= Fountain of Reflection =

1962 fountain and sculpture by George Tsutakawa

- Phi Mu Fountain
- Artist: George Tsutakawa
- Year: 1962
- Location: Seattle, Washington, U.S.
- 47°39′32″N 122°18′26.7″W

Fountain of Reflection (sometimes referred to as Phi Mu Fountain) is a 1962 fountain and sculpture by George Tsutakawa, installed on the campus of the University of Washington, in Seattle. The work was installed outside McKenzie Hall, which was torn down and replaced by Founders Hall, where the fountain remains in the courtyard.
