= Jacob Elshin =

American painter

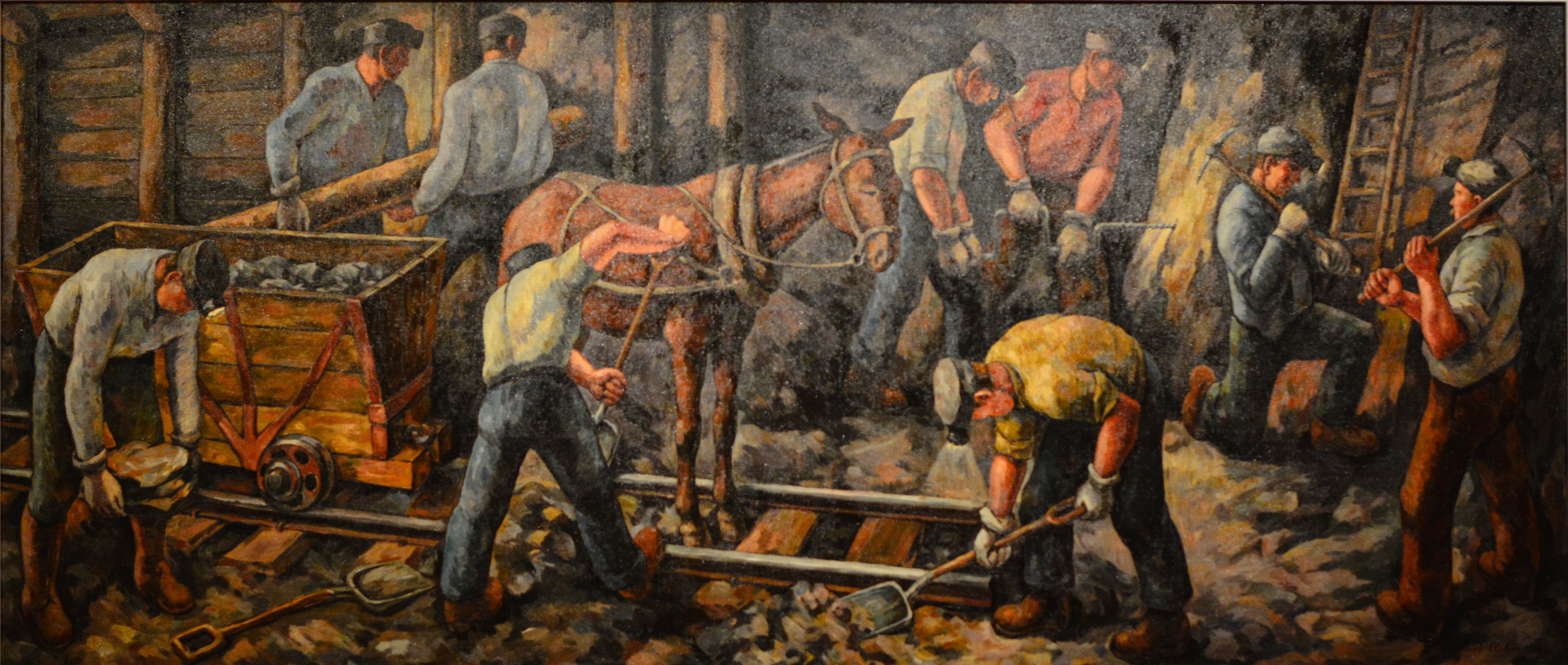
Jacob Elshin, Miners at Work (1938), commissioned by the Section of Painting and Sculpture for the post office in Renton, Washington

Jacob Alexander Elshin (December 30, 1892 – 1976) was an American artist. Born in Saint Petersburg, Russia, he served as an officer in the Imperial Russian Army, and may have been a student at the St. Petersburg Academy. He arrived in Seattle in 1923 where he was described as a "straight pictorialist". His art was commissioned by the Works Progress Administration's Federal Art Project, where he worked with Mark Tobey, Helmi Juvonen, and others. He also provided services to the U.S. Treasury Department's Section of Painting and Sculpture. Elshin socialized with other artists at the Chinese Art Club. He died in Seattle in 1976.
