= William Cumming (artist) =

American painter

- William Cumming, ca. 1984; Photo by Natalia Fobes/Seattle Times
- Born: William Lee Cumming; March 24, 1917; Kalispell, Montana, U.S.
- Died: November 22, 2010 (aged 93); Seattle, Washington, U.S.
- Known for: Painting

William Lee Cumming (March 24, 1917 – November 22, 2010) was a noted 20th-century American artist, often associated with the Northwest School. A controversial figure - he was a hardcore Stalinist for a long period, was married seven times, and was generally outspoken and opinionated - he eventually came to be respected as an important innovator and highly distinctive stylist in modern art, particularly in the Pacific Northwest.

== Biography ==
Evening Conversation, 1956, William Cumming. Collection of Woodside/Braseth Gallery.

Cumming was born March 24, 1917, in Kalispell, Montana, to James Rutherford and Helen Dorcas (Edmiston) Cumming. His father was a salesman. The family moved to Portland, Oregon, and then, when Cumming was seven, to Tukwila, Washington, a farming community south of Seattle.

Fascinated with art, young Bill took drawing courses by correspondence and travelled on weekends to the Seattle Public Library, where he taught himself art history. From an early age he was aware of the work of the local artists - such as Morris Graves, Mark Tobey, and Kenneth Callahan - who would later become known as the 'Northwest School'. After graduating from Foster High School in 1934, he briefly attended a small, short-lived private art school in Seattle. With the Great Depression in full swing, he lived at the family home in Tukwila while taking occasional art lessons and attempting to show his work to prospective employers. He failed to find work, but his enthusiasm and impressive drawing skill led to meeting many of the members of Seattle's small art community, and a job (unpaid) writing for the local arts journal The Town Crier. He was eventually hired by Robert Bruce Inverarity, sketching, photographing, and doing odd jobs with the WPA's Federal Art Project, through which he met Morris Graves and his circle of friends. He became particularly close to artist/writer Margaret Callahan, who encouraged him greatly in developing an original painting style. The Seattle Art Museum bought three of his paintings, and in 1940 he won the top prize for watercolor in SAM's 26th Northwest Annual Exhibition. In 1941 the museum gave him his first solo exhibition.

Cumming's career was interrupted on occasion by both his political leanings, and by bouts of tuberculosis. He spent most of World War II in the Firland Sanatorium. In 1945 he became a member of the Communist party. He was blacklisted by employers and alienated the arts community with his shrill Stalinism; he created little fine art in this period. In 1957, after three marriages and further severe pulmonary problems, he quit the Communist party and began taking greater care of himself. His health improved considerably, and he began the most productive part of his career. He also began teaching at Burnley School of Professional Art (which became the Art Institute of Seattle), and later at Cornish College of the Arts Despite his renunciation of radical politics, issues of social justice and workers' rights remained important to him throughout his life.

Although Cumming was close friends with most of the artists identified as members of the 'Northwest School', his mature work had little to do with the earth-toned, nature-inspired abstraction of the genre. His art was usually figurative, capturing moments of daily life using light and shadow to create form in broad strokes, and utilizing contrasting, vibrant colors to move the viewer through the painting and accentuate the main elements. His scenes usually included people or animals, either in motion or in slice-of-life portrayals. Facial details are minimal. As a life drawing instructor, Cumming would note that you could recognize a friend down the road just by their gait and posture, without ever seeing their face. Body language is a key element in his work. Because of this, he advocated that students paint figures from memory of observation instead of direct figure drawing.

In the late 1950s and early 60s Cumming's work won prizes in several northwest competitions, and in 1961 the Seattle Art Museum presented a very successful solo exhibition. During his marriage to Sue Kruger (at seventeen years, the longest of his seven marriages) he moved to Upper Preston, Washington, where the two raised horses, which became a frequent subject of Cumming's art. He continued teaching for the rest of his life, becoming well known for his outspoken opinions. He derided the pretensions of fine art, declaring that his favorite painter was Eustace Ziegler, a popular painter of romantic Alaskan landscapes.

Cumming authored Sketchbook, A Memoir of the 30s & the Northwest School, which was published in 1984. Another book, William Cumming: The Image of Consequence, by Cumming and Matthew Kangas, was also published in 2005, in conjunction with an exhibition of Cumming's work at the Frye Art Museum.

Cumming died of congestive heart failure on November 22, 2010, at age 93 in Seattle, Washington. William Cumming is buried in Seattle's Lakeview Cemetery, the same cemetery where founders of Seattle and Bruce Lee are laid to rest.

== Bibliography ==
- Cumming, W. (1961). William Cumming. Seattle, WA: Seattle Art Museum. OCLC 78655618
- Cumming, W. (1984). Sketchbook: a memoir of the 1930s and the Northwest School. Seattle: University of Washington Press. ISBN 0-295-96156-2
- Kangas, M., & Cumming, W. (2005). William Cumming: the image of consequence. Seattle: Charles and Emma Frye Art Museum, in association with University of Washington Press, Seattle. ISBN 0-295-98554-2
