= George Tsutakawa =

American painter and sculptor

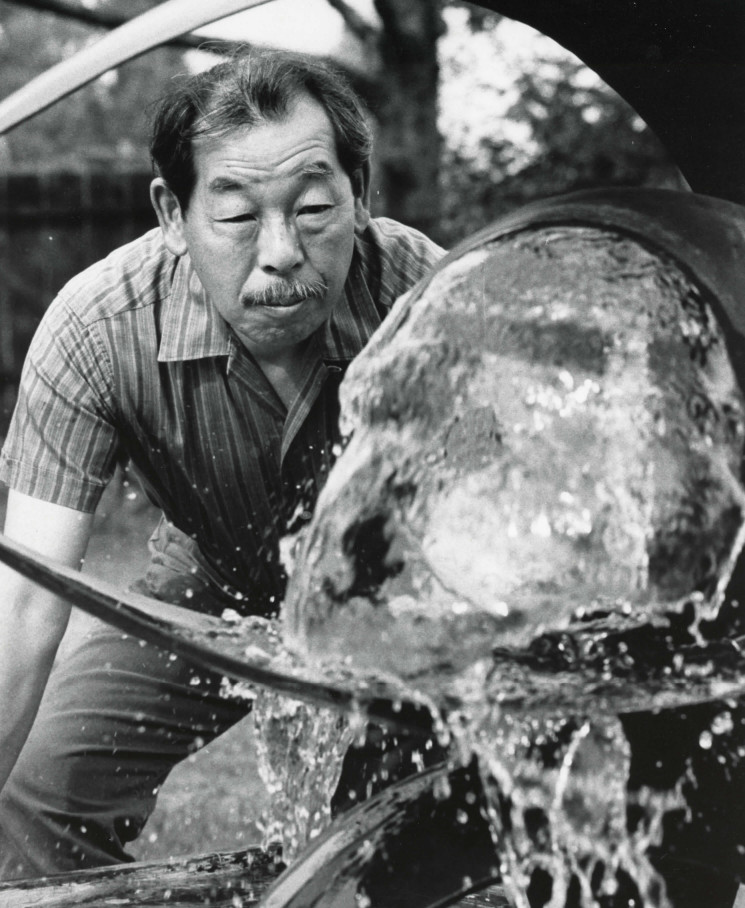
- Born: February 22, 1910; Seattle, Washington, United States
- Died: December 18, 1997 (aged 87); Seattle
- Resting place: Lake View Cemetery
- Education: MFA, University of Washington
- Known for: Painter, sculptor
- Movement: Northwest School
- Children: Gerard, Mayumi, Deems, Marcus
- Awards: Order of the Rising Sun; honorary doctorates

George Tsutakawa (Japanese: 蔦川 譲二, February 22, 1910 – December 18, 1997) was an American painter and sculptor best known for his avant-garde bronze fountain designs.

Born in Seattle, Washington, he was raised in both the United States and Japan. He attended the University of Washington, where, after serving in the U.S. Army during World War 2, he became a teacher. He rose to international prominence as a fountain designer in the 1960s and 1970s. During his long career more than 70 of his distinctive fountains—many of them still extant—were placed in public spaces.

Tsutakawa is often associated with the progressive 'Northwest School' of artists, and is among the major, influential figures of modern Asian-American art.

== Early years ==
Family Group, 1948, George Tsutakawa

George Tsutakawa was born February 22, 1910, in Seattle, Washington. He was named in honor of George Washington (whose birthday is Feb. 22nd). His parents, Shozo and Hisa, were both born in Japan. He was the fourth of nine children, all of whom, except for his eldest sister, were born in the US. George's father and two uncles ran a successful import-export business, Tsutakawa Company, shipping mainly lumber and scrap metal to Japan, and general goods from Japan to the U.S.

George moved to his mother's hometown of Fukuyama in Hiroshima at age seven, along with his siblings, while his father remained in Seattle. His mother died of influenza in 1918; and his father remarried.

The family lived with their maternal grandmother. As a big, dairy-fed American kid who spoke very little Japanese, George had trouble fitting in, and found comfort in art. His grandparents introduced him to traditional Japanese art forms such as Kabuki and Noh drama, Sumi-e painting, calligraphy, wood-block printing, ceramics, flower arranging, and the tea ceremony; at the same time, he studied European and American art, and developed a lifelong love of Western classical music. He showed promise as an artist, but to his father's disappointment he was a mediocre student with little interest in joining the family business.

After finishing high school and brief service as a reservist-trainee in the Imperial Japanese Army, Tsutakawa, 16, returned to the U.S. Now a Japanese-speaker, he enrolled in Seattle's Broadway High School, where he re-learned English and studied art, falling in with a group of progressive-minded young artists which included Morris Graves, Andrew Chinn, and Fay Chong. He also visited and informally studied with Kamekichi Tokita, Kenjiro Nomura, and other older artists from Seattle's vibrant Asian-American arts community.

== College and the Army ==
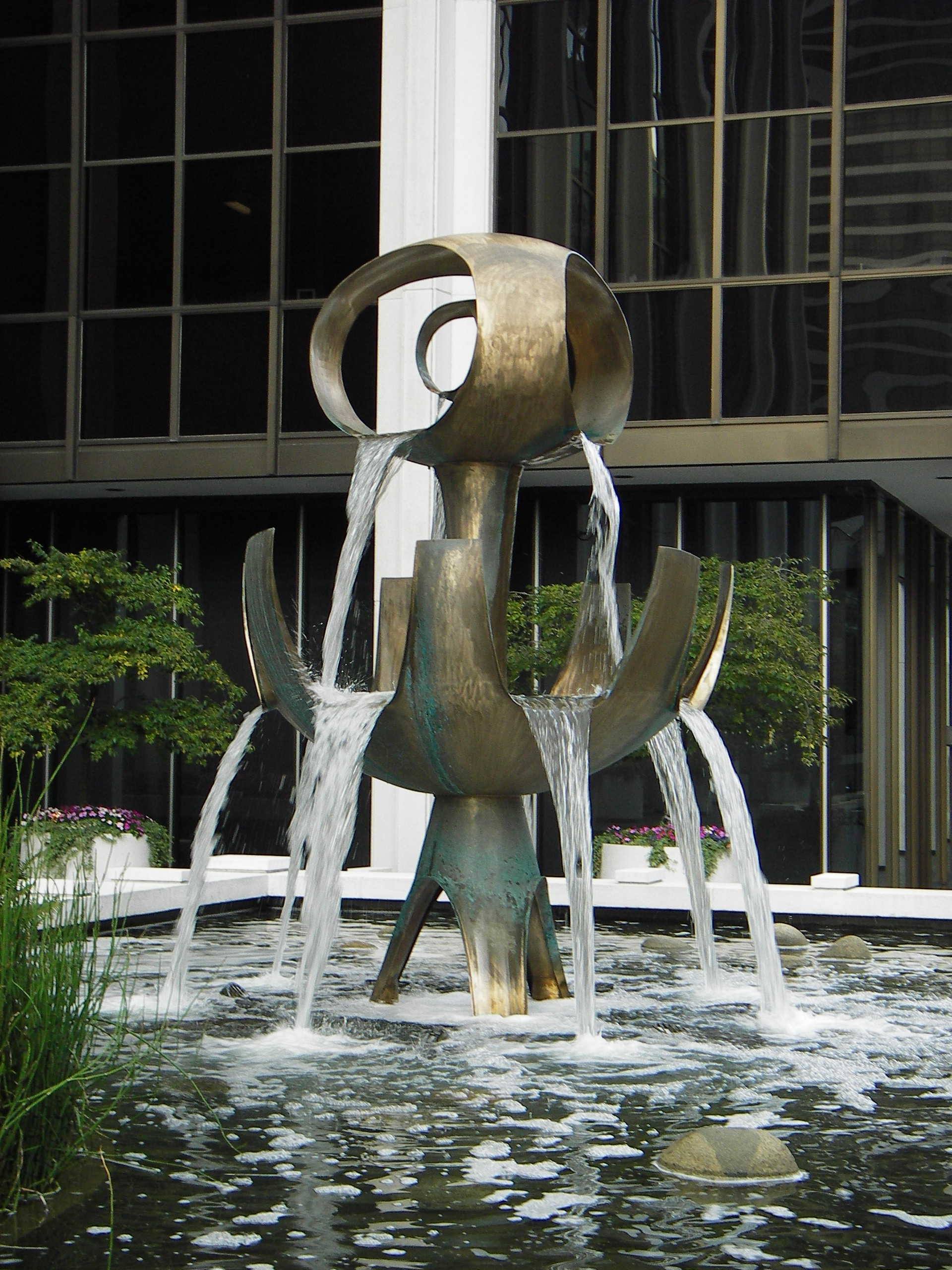
Fountain of the Pioneers in Vancouver, BC

At the urging of Broadway High art teacher Hannah Jones, Tsutakawa enrolled in the University of Washington, where he studied under sculptor Dudley Pratt, who guided him both artistically and in the craft of producing large sculpture. He also worked with Alexander Archipenko, a renowned sculptor who occasionally taught classes at the U of W. Tsutakawa paid his tuition by working at a grocery owned by his uncle, and by working summers at a cannery in Alaska, which gave him the opportunity to visit native villages, examine the carvings on ceremonial buildings and totem poles, and talk to carvers. He made drawings and linocuts of fish, fishermen, the canneries, and the dramatic Alaskan landscape.

He continued to paint and make prints (as he would throughout his life), but, when it came time to declare his major, chose sculpture. He received his BFA in 1937. Although he had paintings and prints in several exhibitions, and was actively involved in Seattle's arts community, he didn't immediately focus on a career in art, as he was helping his uncles with the family business.

After the attack on Pearl Harbor on December 7, 1941, most of Tsutakawa's Japanese-American friends and family were interned or relocated to primitive camps in the interior Western U.S., and the Tsutakawa Company was seized by the government. Tsutakawa himself, as a male, U.S.-born Nisei of military age, was drafted into the Army. While training at Camp Robinson in Arkansas his artistic abilities became known, and he was often asked to paint portraits of officers, or murals in officers' clubs. He was later assigned to duty teaching Japanese language at a Military Intelligence school in Minnesota. In his free time he visited museums in Minneapolis, Chicago, Boston, and New York.

Tsutakawa also visited friends and family in the internment camps. During a visit to the Tule Lake camp in California he met and fell in love with Ayame Iwasa, a friend of his sister Sadako. Although she was ten years younger than he, she was, like Tsutakawa, a Nisei who had been educated in Japan. He soon proposed marriage. She eventually accepted.

When the war ended, Tsutakawa returned to Seattle. Taking advantage of the G.I. Bill, he resumed studies at the University of Washington, earning his MFA degree. In 1947 Ayame and George were married at a Buddhist temple in Seattle. The first of their four children was born later the same year.

== Career ==
In the late-1940s Tsutakawa began teaching part-time at the University of Washington. An important influence on him at this time was a book, written by U.S. Supreme Court Justice William O. Douglas, which depicted obos, the ceremonial stone piles created by religious pilgrims in the Himalayas.

Tsutakawa eventually began teaching full-time. His work - mostly paintings, prints, small sculpture, and wood carving - was shown in the Northwest Annuals at the Seattle Art Museum, at the Henry Art Gallery, the Zoe Dusanne Gallery, and various other places. He did several commissioned pieces - including sculpture, door carvings, and gates - for local businesses and institutions. He also designed chairs, tables, and lamps. In 1954 he and Ayame bought a large house which became his studio and a regular meeting place for friends such as Paul Horiuchi, Mark Tobey, John Matsudaira, Johsel Namkung, and many others. In 1956 Tsutakawa travelled to Japan for the first time in nearly thirty years, visiting an exhibition of his and Horiuchi's work at the Yoseida Gallery in Tokyo and reuniting with family members.

Our sense of continuity and rhythm is universal in water. Even in childhood I was interested in running water, in the recycling process of water. I remember Mark Tobey talking to me about the life cycle of the universe and the fact that water moves about endlessly in its various forms, vapor, ice drops forming in the clouds to be released into the rivers. This recycling always fascinated me.

— George Tsutakawa, "Personality Profile" (interview with Jane Estes, 1978)

=== Fountains ===
In 1958 Tsutakawa was asked to design and build a fountain for the new main Seattle Central Library being built in downtown Seattle. He accepted, although he had never created a fountain before. After two years of daunting mishaps, he and Jack Uchida, a Boeing engineer who would become his lifelong technical expert and assistant, finished Fountain of Wisdom, a tall silicon bronze abstract design suggestive of obos, totem poles, and pagodas. Artist, public, and critics were all delighted with the work, whose fusion of Asian, Native American, and modern Abstract Expressionist elements was deeply evocative of the Pacific Northwest. Almost by happenstance, Tsutakawa had found a new medium for his artistic energies.

In the 1970s and 1980s Tsutakawa emerged as the world's preeminent creator of fountains, installing them in cities throughout the United States, Canada, and Japan. "For Tsutakawa, ultimately water stands in relation to humanity and to life as the great continuing cycle of all things," art historian Martha Kingsbury pointed out.

For me, 1960 or thereabouts was a time to take another look at the philosophy and art of the Orient—particularly Japanese art—that I had become familiar with in my youth. Through my travels and my studies of traditional Japanese arts I was able to reaffirm my conviction in the Oriental view of nature which sees man as one part of nature, a part that must live in harmony with the rest of nature. From 1960 on, I attempted to express this relationship between man and nature in my works. My sumi-e drawings are a direct response to nature; my fountain sculptures are an attempt to unify water—the life force of the universe that flows in an elusive cyclical course throughout eternity—with an immutable metal sculpture.

— George Tsutakawa, "A Personal Statement" (1982)

Beginning in the 1960s Tsutakawa traveled extensively. In addition to regular trips to Japan, he traveled throughout Asia, Europe, and Mexico.

Tsutakawa designed, built, and installed 75 fountains. Most were made of bronze, though he used stainless steel and aluminum for a few. He often executed two or three fountain commissions a year, all while continuing to teach at the University of Washington and pursue his interests in other art forms.

== Later years ==
In 1976 Tsutakawa retired after 34 years of teaching Art and Architecture at the University of Washington. Named Professor Emeritus, he continued to teach occasional classes and participate in special events at the university.

In 1977 he traveled to Nepal, where he at last saw in person the stacked rocks of the obos whose forms had for so long influenced his work. He later described seeing more than twenty such piles against a backdrop of Mount Everest as the most exciting experience of his life.

After an earlier heart attack left him weakened, Tsutakawa died at his home in Seattle on December 18, 1997.

George and Ayame Tsutakawa had four children: Gerard (b: 1947), Mayumi (b: 1949), Deems (b: 1951), and Marcus (b: 1954). Gerard Tsutakawa apprenticed under his father and is himself an accomplished sculptor; Mayumi Tsutakawa is an author and editor who has worked for the Washington State Arts Commission and the Wing Luke Museum; Marcus Tsutakawa is music director at Garfield High School in Seattle; and Deems Tsutakawa (d. 2021) was a well-known Northwest jazz musician.

== Major works ==
- Centennial Fountain, Seattle
- Fountain of Reflection (1962), Seattle
- Fountain of Wisdom, Seattle
- Naramore Fountain

== Awards and recognitions ==
- Honorary Doctorate from Whitman College
- Honorary Doctorate from Seattle University
- Order of the Rising Sun, Gold Rays with Rosette from the Emperor of Japan in 1981
- Alumnus Summa Laude Dignatus from University of Washington (1984)
