= Paul Horiuchi =

American painter

Paul Horiuchi painting, 1960s. Photo by George Uchida.

Paul Chikamasa Horiuchi (Japanese: 堀内 親正, April 12, 1906 – August 29, 1999) was an American painter and collagist. He was born in Yamanashi, Japan, and studied art from an early age. After immigrating to the United States in his early teens, he spent many years as a railroad worker in the Western U.S. In 1946, he moved to Seattle, Washington, where he eventually switched his focus from painting to collage and came to be associated with the "Northwest School" of artists. In his mid-forties, he was finally able to devote himself to art full-time, his unusual collage style becoming very popular in the 1950s and 60s. He continued creating art at his studio in Seattle until succumbing to Alzheimer's-related health problems in 1999.

Today, Horiuchi is best known to the public for The Seattle Mural, commissioned for the Century 21 Exposition in 1962 and now forming the glass mosaic backdrop to the Seattle Center's Mural Amphitheater. His paintings and collage remain highly prized by collectors, are on permanent display at several museums, and continue to be the subject of special exhibitions at various museums and galleries.

== Childhood ==
Paul Horiuchi was born Chikamasa Horiuchi on April 12, 1906, in the village of Oishi, on the shores of Lake Kawaguchi, near Mount Fuji, in Japan. He was the second son of Daisaku Horiuchi, a cabinetmaker and Kabuki singer, and his wife Yasu. His father departed for the United States when Chikamasa was a few days old, followed by his mother four years later. Chikamasa and his older brother Toshimasa (later known as "Tom") were raised by their grandfather, Tokutaro Horiuchi, an antiques collector.

Horiuchi was a runner in his early teens, his best time for the 100-meter dash reputedly tying the Olympic record. He was nominated for Japan's Olympic team, but had to stop running due to an enlarged heart.

Under Iketani, a locally prominent artist, Horiuchi studied traditional sumi-e (or ink wash) technique, and won second prize in a nationwide landscape painting competition.

== Early years in the U.S. ==
When Chikamasa was fourteen, his older brother left to join their parents in America, and Chikamasa followed suit two years later, boarding ship for the United States on December 21, 1920. A few days later, he arrived in Seattle, where he was greeted by his older cousin Shigetoshi Horiuchi, a trader and collector of Asian art whose connections in Pacific Northwest art circles would later prove helpful to Chikamasa. He then traveled on to meet his family in the busy railroad town of Rock Springs, Wyoming. Although he had never seen his father before, he recognized him immediately by his resemblance to Toshimasa. Daisaku was working for the Union Pacific Railroad as a maintenance foreman in nearby Kanda, Wyoming, and it was there that Chikamasa met his seven- and eight-year-old American-born sisters and three-year-old brother for the first time.

Weathered, 1956, Paul Horiuchi

Chikamasa began working for Union Pacific with his father. To get around company rules forbidding family members from working on the same gangs, he adopted his mother's maiden name, Kamakura, and was thus known as Chikamasa Kamakura for many years. He also fudged his age, from 15 up to 16, and learned accent-free Spanish from Mexican fellow laborers. By age 17, he was a section foreman.

When Horiuchi had been in the U.S. for about a year, his 45-year-old father died of stomach cancer and his mother returned to Japan with the three younger children shortly afterwards. Chikamasa and Toshimasa were left with very little money to live on as they tried to both support their mother and pay off debts which their father had incurred. In 1929, the brothers opened a radio sales and repair shop, but it was soon lost in the Great Depression, and they returned to work on the railroad.

Horiuchi painted in his free time, mostly doing landscapes in the Sumi-e style, but experimenting with more modern American and European approaches as well. He received some notice in newspapers in Wyoming and Utah. During trips to Seattle to visit his cousin Shigetoshi, he met and befriended the painters Kenjiro Nomura and Kamekichi Tokita, who were important influences. He also became friends with Tamotsu Takizaki, a zen master and kendo instructor who would play an important role in shaping his career.

In 1934, during a visit to Seattle, he met and fell in love with Bernadette Suda, who was seven years younger than he. Shigetoshi and Takizaki helped arrange their courtship, and, after Horiuchi converted to Roman Catholicism and changed his first name to "Paul" in homage to Paul Cézanne, they married in Seattle in 1935. On moving back to Rock Springs with her new husband, Bernadette was shocked by life in Union Pacific company housing, which had neither electricity or indoor plumbing, but soon adapted. They had two sons, Paul, Jr. and Jon (a third, Vincent, was born later, in Seattle). In 1937, Horiuchi, who had continued to use 'Kamakura', officially reverted to his real last name.

Although conditions were rough in Wyoming, Horiuchi was making good money, was able to purchase a new car, made regular trips to visit friends and family in Seattle, and continued to develop his painting skills, often using his wife and children as subject matter. In 1938, paintings of his were included in Annual Exhibitions at the Oakland Art Museum, the San Francisco Museum of Art, and the Seattle Art Museum.

The advent of the Second World War brought extreme hardship for the Horiuchis. They lived far enough inland that they were not subject to forced relocation, but all Japanese were immediately fired by Union Pacific and evicted from company housing. People of Japanese ancestry were often physically threatened, and denied decent work and housing. The Horiuchis were forced to live in a homemade trailer much of the time, while Paul worked various temporary, menial jobs. Unable to carry it with them, and fearing it would get them in trouble with the authorities, Horiuchi burned his collection of old Japanese books and prints; a collection of twenty-five of his best paintings, left with a friend, was destroyed in a flood. At one point, the family applied for placement in a relocation camp (a not uncommon occurrence for desperate Japanese-Americans seeking shelter and food), but were denied.

In 1944, the almost 40-year-old Horiuchi was offered a job as an apprentice auto repairman in Spokane, Washington, and from there his luck began to change.

== In the Pacific Northwest ==
With the war over, Horiuchi and his family moved to Seattle, where he opened Paul's Body and Fender Shop in the city's bustling International District. The business was a success. At the same time, Horiuchi's career as an artist began to take off. In 1947 he won first prize in oil painting at the Western Washington Fair, which at that time was a well-respected exhibition juried by major figures from the West Coast art world, and in 1948 his painting Boat House was shown in the Seattle Art Museum's 34th Northwest Annual Exhibition. He also began receiving the attention of critics and journalists.

Memory IV, Paul Horiuchi, ca. 1963

In 1950, Horiuchi suffered a fall from a ladder in which he severely injured his left wrist, and was unable to work for several months. As the Horiuchis reached financial desperation, a family friend asked if he could try selling some of Paul's paintings. To Horiuchi's surprise, the friend quickly sold four of his works for a considerable amount of money. Horiuchi closed his auto repair shop and opened Tozai ("East-West") Art, an antique shop which also served as his studio and gallery, and as a meeting place for artists.

In 1953, a change in the law allowed Horiuchi to become a U.S. citizen.

Through Takizaki he met and became close friends with the painter Mark Tobey, which led Horiuchi to re-examine his own approach to art. He became increasingly interested in collage, and began experimenting with the fusion of elements of traditional Japanese collage with more modern techniques, styles, and materials. At its most basic level, he was combining 'Eastern' shikishi design with 'Western' abstract expressionism, but injecting it with a unique energy, perhaps born of Horiuchi's numerous personal ups and downs and dislocations. He gradually gained command of this new style and, in the late 1950s, his work became increasingly popular.

== Successful artist ==
On May 5, 1957, Horiuchi's first solo show opened at the Zoë Dusanne Gallery in Seattle. It was a spectacular success, with twenty-two out of twenty-five paintings quickly sold. The following year, the first solo museum exhibition of his work was held at the Seattle Art Museum, and he gained his first broad exposure outside the Northwest when some of his pieces were chosen for the Rome-New York Art Foundation Exhibit, in New York and Rome.

His annual shows at Seattle's Woodside/Braseth Gallery became major events; on one occasion, all of Horiuchi's works sold before the show even opened to the public - much to his irritation.

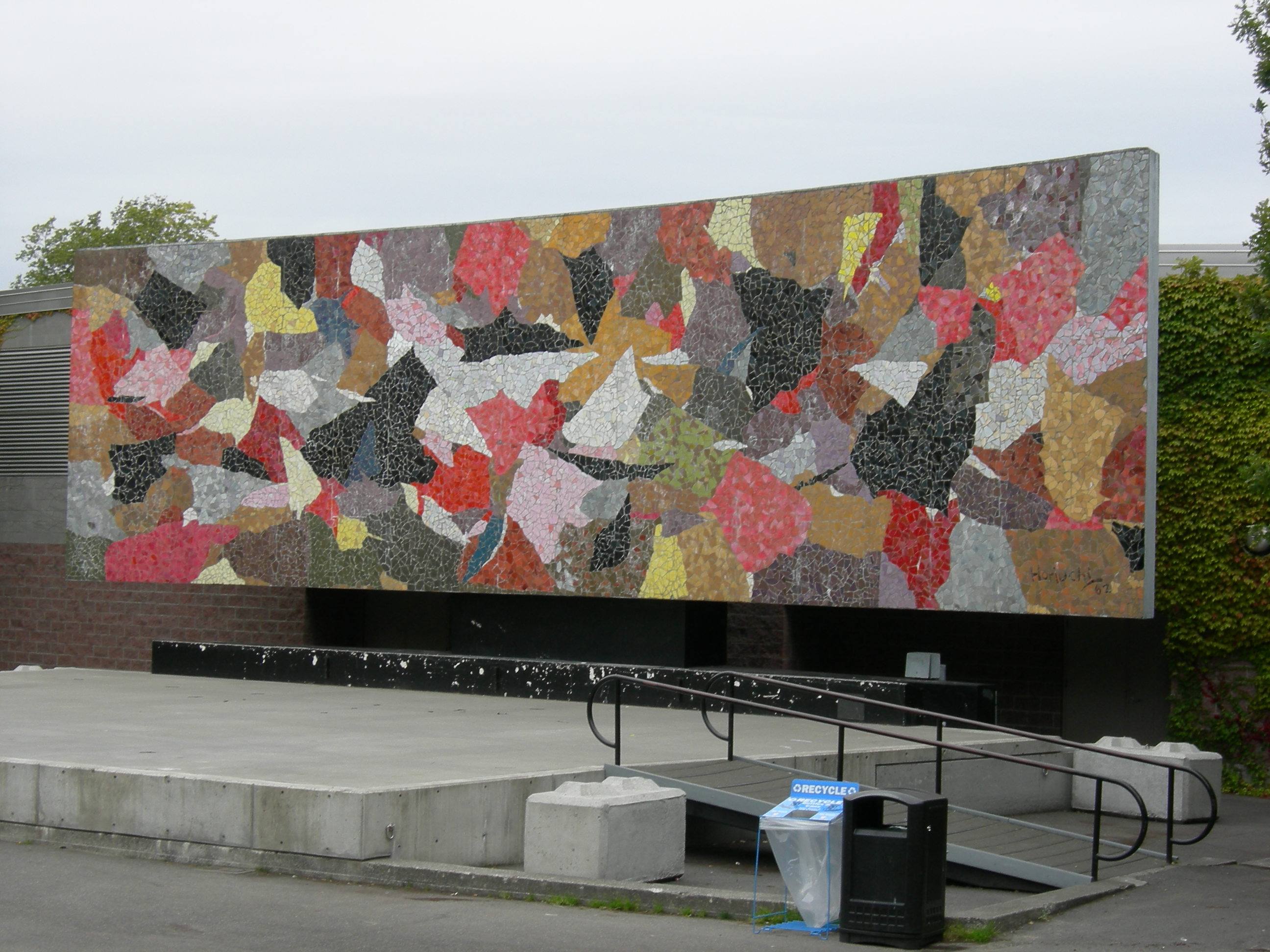
The Seattle Mural (1962) forms the backdrop for the Mural Amphitheater at the Seattle Center.

His collages were shown at the Carnegie Art International Exhibition in Pittsburgh in 1961, and again in 1964. In 1962, when Seattle hosted the Century 21 World's Fair, Horiuchi received a commission to create a huge (17' x 60') outdoor mural which would serve as the backdrop for an amphitheater at the Seattle Center. Today, the Mural Amphitheater's glass mosaic backdrop remains his most popularly known work.

In 1966, Paul and Bernadette moved into a house designed for them by architect Gregory Saito. It featured a spacious basement studio overlooking Seattle's Rainier Beach neighborhood. Paul indulged his love of expensive bonsai trees, while Bernadette continued her 22-year career at the International Branch of Seattle First National Bank.

Horiuchi's work was widely praised by critics. Said Michiaki Kawakita, curator in chief of Japan's National Museum of Modern Art in Tokyo: "He is fast approaching the complete mastery of his new technique [...] His work is of the finest produced today".

== Final years ==
In his later years, Horiuchi suffered from stomach cancer - which had killed his father - but surgery to eradicate it was successful. Later, however, he was diagnosed with Alzheimer's and died of complications from the disease on August 29, 1999.

His memorial service at St. Paul Catholic Church in Seattle was filled to capacity with family and friends. The program contained the following quote from Horiuchi:

"I have always wanted to create something serene, the peace and serenity, the quality needed to balance the sensationalism in our surroundings today. Maybe I'm old fashioned, but I'm seeking beauty and truth in nature. This philosophy of mine hasn't changed for the last 50 years."

== Honors received ==
- 1968 awarded honorary Doctor of Humanities degree by the University of Puget Sound.
- 1976 deemed a "Sacred Treasure" (4th Class) by the Emperor of Japan in 1976.
- 1979 awarded honorary doctorate by St. Martin's College.
- 1989 awarded Washington state Governor's Award of Special Commendation.
- 1995 Received a Lifetime Achievement Award from The Wing Luke Asian Museum.

In 2003 Bernadette and Paul Horiuchi, Jr. helped dedicate Horiuchi Park, about two blocks from the site where Paul, Sr. had opened his auto repair shop in Seattle's Yesler Terrace neighborhood. The park was later converted into a P-Patch communal garden.

== Exhibitions ==
Solo exhibitions of Horiuchi's work were presented almost every year in Seattle at the Zoë Dusanne Gallery from 1957 to 1963, and at the Woodside/Braseth Gallery (incl. predecessors Gordon Woodside Gallery in Seattle and San Francisco) from 1965 to 1993. The Seattle Art Museum held solo exhibits in 1958 and 2000, and has included his works in group shows almost annually since 1948. The Tacoma Art Museum presented solo shows in 1960, 1967, and 1987, and group shows featuring his work in 1969, 1986, 1989, 1995, and 1996. He was in group shows nearly annually at the University of Washington's Henry Gallery from 1949 to 1960, and in 1971 and 1998. His work has appeared in exhibitions at the Bellevue Arts Museum, the Museum of Northwest Art (La Conner, WA), Wing Luke Asian Museum (Seattle), and many other galleries, museums, schools, fairs, government buildings, and corporate institutes in the Pacific Northwest.

The Felix Landau Gallery in Los Angeles presented solo shows in 1960, 1962, and 1966, and the Nordness Gallery in New York City in 1963, 1964, and 1965. He was included in Art Across America: An Exhibition of 50 Contemporary American Paintings and Wall-Hung Constructions, which appeared in 17 cities in 1965-67. In 1974 his work was in the Smithsonian Institution's Art of the Pacific Northwest exhibition in Washington, D.C.

Since 1956, Horiuchi's work has been exhibited several times in Japan and was celebrated in a 2003 solo show at the Yamanashi Prefectural Museum of Art.
