= Moriguchi (surname) =

Moriguchi (written: 森口 lit. "forest mouth/entry") is a Japanese surname. Notable people with the surname include:

- Denise Moriguchi (born 1976), American businesswoman
- Fujimatsu Moriguchi (森口 富士松; 1898–1962), Japanese businessman
- Hiroko Moriguchi (森口 博子; born 1968), Japanese singer
- Kakō Moriguchi (森口 華弘; 1909–2008), Japanese textile artist
- Kunihiko Moriguchi (森口 邦彦; born 1941), Japanese textile artist
- Sadako Moriguchi (森口 貞子; 1907–2002), American businesswoman
- Sumitada Moriguchi (森口 澄士; born 2001), Japanese figure skater
- Tomio Moriguchi (森口 富雄; born 1936), American businessman and activist
- Yoko Moriguchi (森口 瑤子; born 1966), Japanese actress
- Yuko Moriguchi (森口 祐子; born 1955), Japanese golfer

== See also ==
- Tomoko Moriguchi-Matsuno (born 1945), American businesswoman
