= Denise Moriguchi =

American businesswoman

- Born: 1976 (age 48–49); Seattle, Washington, US
- Occupation: Businesswoman
- Years active: 2013–present
- Employer: Uwajimaya
- Spouses: Rob Vong
- Children: 2

Denise Ritsuko Moriguchi (born 1976) is an American businesswoman who is the president of Uwajimaya since 2016 and its CEO since 2017.

== Biography ==
Moriguchi is the daughter of Tomio Moriguchi, who was the CEO of Uwajimaya. Her aunt Tomoko Moriguchi-Matsuno also was CEO. She is the great-niece of George Tsutakawa.

After graduating from Lakeside School, Moriguchi moved to the east coast of the United States for further education. She obtained a degree in economics and Asian studies from Bowdoin College in 1998 and has a Master of Business Administration from MIT Sloan School of Management. She is the first member of her family to hold an MBA. After obtaining an MBA, Moriguchi worked at Dove Consulting and Bayer HealthCare before returning to Seattle in 2013 so that she can continue her work at Uwajimaya while having her two children grow up with their extended family.

Moriguchi acceded to her position as president of Uwajimaya on March 1, 2016. She succeeded her aunt to the position as CEO of Uwajimaya in February 2017. She was also appointed to the Washington State Convention Center's board of directors in February. She was interviewed by the North American Post about her experiences prior to her tenure as CEO that same year. Her family received the 2017 Tomodachi Award for their contributions to the relations between Japan and Seattle.

Moriguchi was one of the members of the 2018 Japanese American Leadership Delegation. In May 2018, Moriguchi called for the city of Seattle to abandon a proposed head tax, saying that it is not only "an Amazon tax." She argued that the proposed tax would also impact smaller companies, including Uwajimaya, greatly. When the head tax came to effect, she contributed to efforts to repeal the tax. She was elected to American Automobile Association Washington's Board of Trustees in November.
