= John Matsudaira =

American painter

John T. Matsudaira
- Born: Takehisa Matsudaira; November 26, 1922; Seattle, Washington
- Died: January 30, 2007 (aged 84); Seattle, Washington
- Education: O'Dea High School
- Alma mater: The Art Institute of Seattle
- Movement: Social realism, Northwest School
- Spouse: Lillian Inouye (m. 1951; died 2007)
- Relatives: Mich Matsudaira (brother), Paul Matsudaira (son)

John Takehisa Matsudaira (November 11, 1922 – January 30, 2007) was an American painter active mainly in Seattle, Washington from the 1940s through the 1970s. He was involved in the Pacific Northwest's vibrant Asian-American art community, and is sometimes associated with the 'Northwest School' of artists.

John Matsudaira in Oct. 3, 1961, issue of The North American Post. Photographer unknown.

== Early life ==
Takehisa Matsudaira (known as "John" from childhood) was born in Seattle, Washington on November 11, 1922, into a large Japanese-American family headed by Thomas and Theresa Matsudaira. He had eight brothers, including Mich Matsudaira, and four sisters.

At the age of six he was sent to live with relatives in the castle town of Kanazawa, in Japan. Artistically inclined, he won a prize for a drawing in a citywide art competition. On his return to the United States in 1935 at age 12 he studied at Maryknoll School, and then O'Dea High School, in Seattle.

Self-portrait (injured in a foxhole), 1953, John Matsudaira. Collection of the Matsudaira family.

Following the Japanese attack on Pearl Harbor and American entry into the Second World War in 1941, Executive Order 9066 was signed. Matsudaira, along with his family, was forcibly relocated to Camp Minidoka in Idaho. He later volunteered to serve in the U.S. Army's all-Nisei 442nd Infantry Regiment. After training at Camp Shelby in Mississippi, he was severely wounded in combat in Italy in 1944, and spent two and a half years in recovery. It was an experience he rarely spoke of later, only telling a friend, "It's hard to explain to anyone who wasn't there."

== Career ==
On his return to Seattle in 1947, Matsudaira made use of the G.I. Bill to enroll in the Burnley Art School, where he studied with noted artists Jacob Elshin and Nick Damascus. At this time he was working in a Social Realist style, often painting urban or waterfront scenes, in oil and watercolor. He entered pieces in the Seattle Art Museum's Northwest Annual juried exhibition several years in a row, gaining considerable notice. He became friends with prominent artists such as Paul Horiuchi, Kenjiro Nomura, George Tsutakawa, and Mark Tobey; the influence of Horiuchi and Tobey, in particular, can be seen in some of his early work.

Around 1950 Matsudaira began his career of over thirty years as a draftsman at the Boeing aircraft company. He had started out painting in the cramped kitchen of the apartment he and his wife Lillian shared in Seattle's First Hill neighborhood, but as the first of their four children came along, they were able to buy a more spacious home in the Rainier Beach neighborhood.

Quiet Motion and Blue, 1961, John Matsudaira. Collection of the Matsudaira family.

Despite his commitments to work and family, Matsudaira was a dedicated artist, continually experimenting with new techniques, materials, and means of expression. A 1953 oil painting, Self-portrait (Injured in a foxhole), is figurative yet highly symbolic, representing the foxhole in which he was nearly killed as a place of both death and rebirth. His art evolved toward abstraction, with works such as Adoration (1955) and Quiet Motion and Blue (1961) having a sombre, introspective quality.

Matsudaira's work was shown at the 1962 World's Fair in Seattle, the International Art Exhibition in Chinatown, the Seattle Art Museum, the Zoe Dusanne Gallery, and many other institutions around the Northwest.

== Later years ==
For a time Matsudaira was a major figure in the Pacific Northwest's Asian-American art community, even sharing an exhibition with Horiuchi, Tsutakawa, and Nomura at the Dusanne Gallery in 1954; by the late 1970s, however, his output - never prolific - slowed to a trickle, and his art was largely forgotten.

Matsudaira died in Seattle on January 30, 2007; his memorial service was held at St. Paul's Catholic Church.

== Legacy ==
In the 2010s, due to the efforts of family members, a handful of curators and journalists, and a general upsurge of interest in mid-century modern art in the Pacific Northwest, Matsudaira's work has been reintroduced to the public, with new appreciation for the scope and depth of his artistic career.

In May 2016 the first-ever retrospective of Matsudaira's life and work, curated by David F. Martin, opened at the Cascadia Art Museum in Edmonds, Washington.
