= Dochi =

Doughnut chain

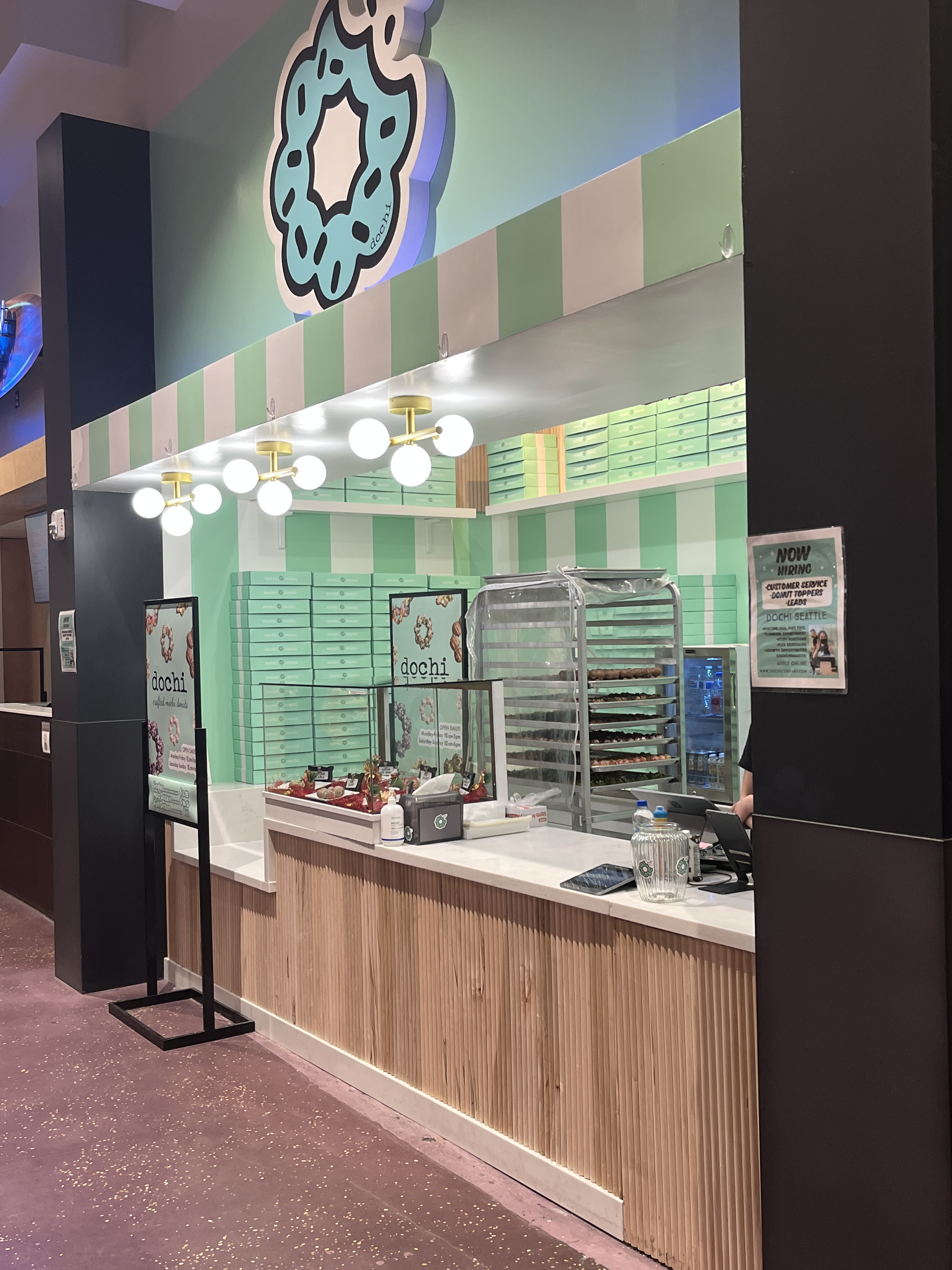
- Dochi at Uwajimaya in Seattle
- Products: Doughnuts
- Website: www.dochicompany.com

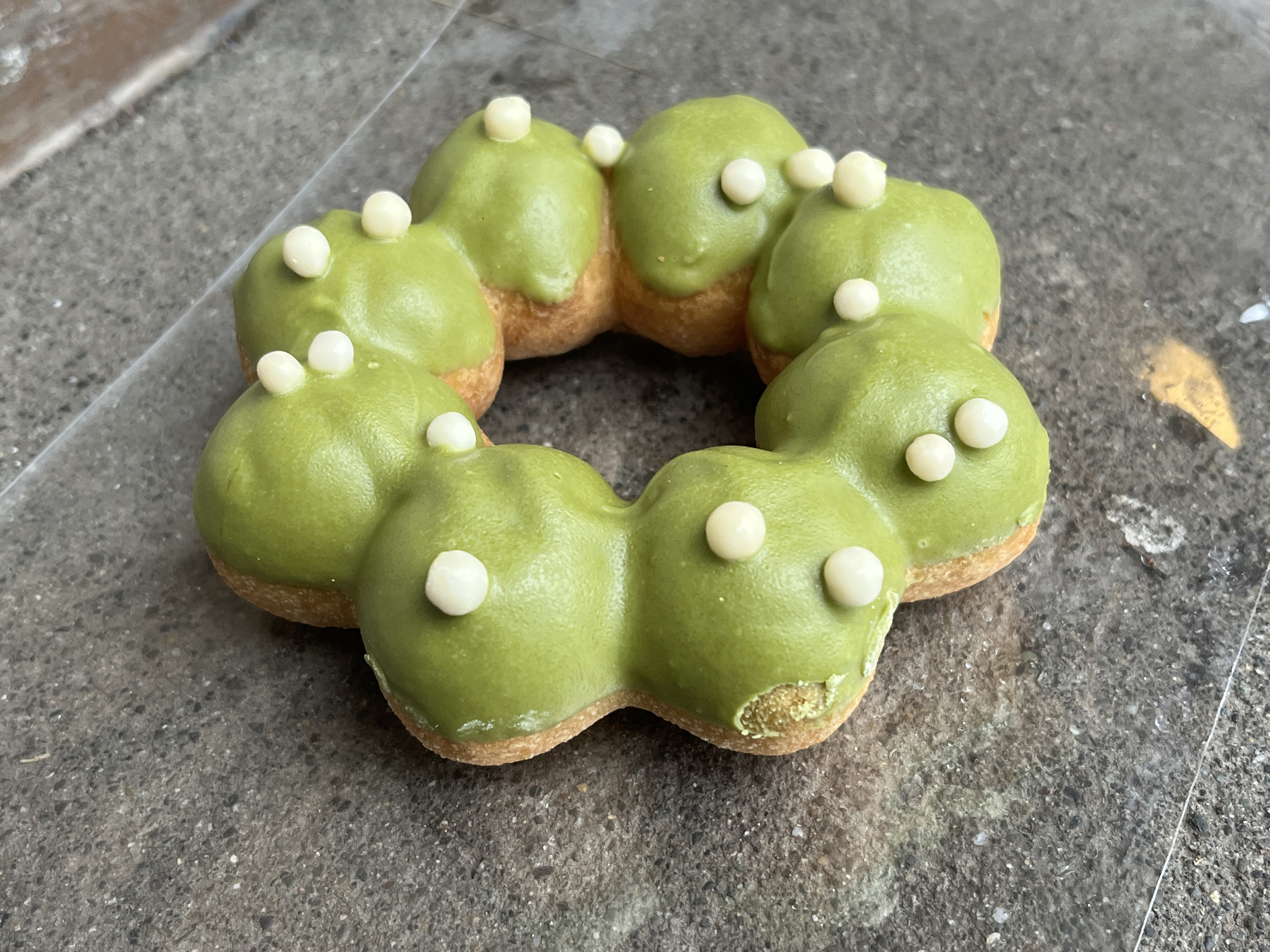
Matcha doughnut

Dochi is a doughnut chain based in the U.S. state of Florida.

== History ==
The business began operating in Uwajimaya's food court in Seattle's Chinatown-International District in 2019, and in Denver in 2021.

== Reception ==
Callie Craighead included Dochi in Seattle Post-Intelligencer's 2021 list of the city's 9 best doughnut shops. In 2022, Allecia Vermillion included the business in Seattle Metropolitan's overview of the city's best doughnuts, and Westword included Dochi in a list of Denver's 6 best doughnut shops.
