= Ramen Ryoma =

Chain of Japanese restaurants in the US and Chile

Coordinates: 45.5202°N 122.6829°W

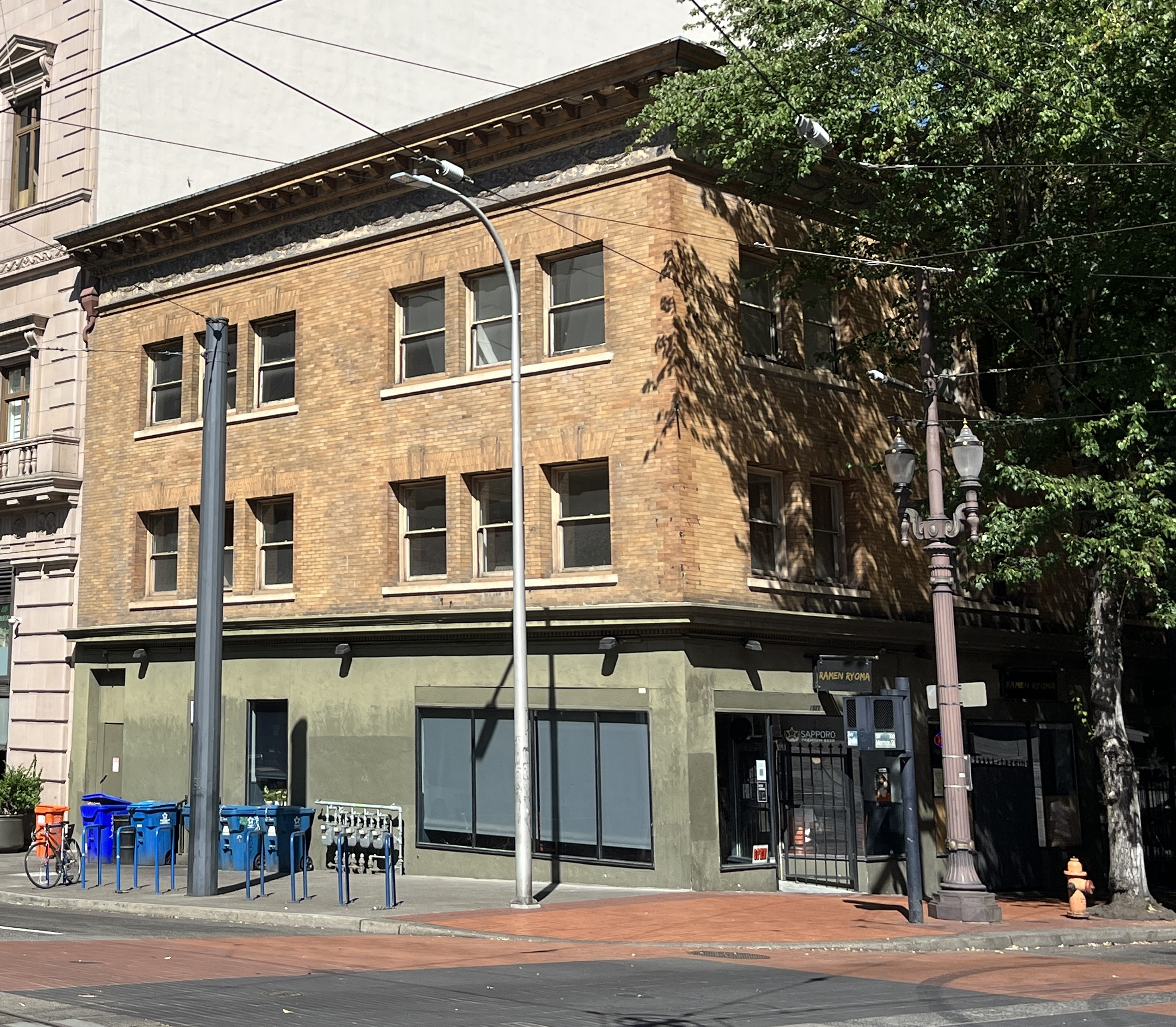
- Exterior of the Ramen Ryoma location in Portland, Oregon, 2023
- Interactive map of Ramen Ryoma

Restaurant information
- Owner: Yoshinari Ichise
- Food type: Japanese
- Location: United States; Chile
- Website: ramenryoma.net

Ramen Ryoma is a Japanese restaurant chain with locations in the United States and Chile. In the U.S., the restaurant operates in the Portland metropolitan area and in San Diego, California.

== Description ==
Ramen Ryoma is a Japanese restaurant with multiple locations in the United States and Chile. The Beaverton, Oregon restaurant is attached to a Uwajimaya store and serves shio, shoyu, and miso broths, as well as chashu pork, pan-fried pork gyoza, and kurobuta sausage. Ramen Ryoma's menu has also included corn butter miso ramen, spicy umami ramen, Japanese style-curry housemade egg noodles, sushi and sashimi, takoyaki, and yakitori.

== History ==
=== Oregon ===
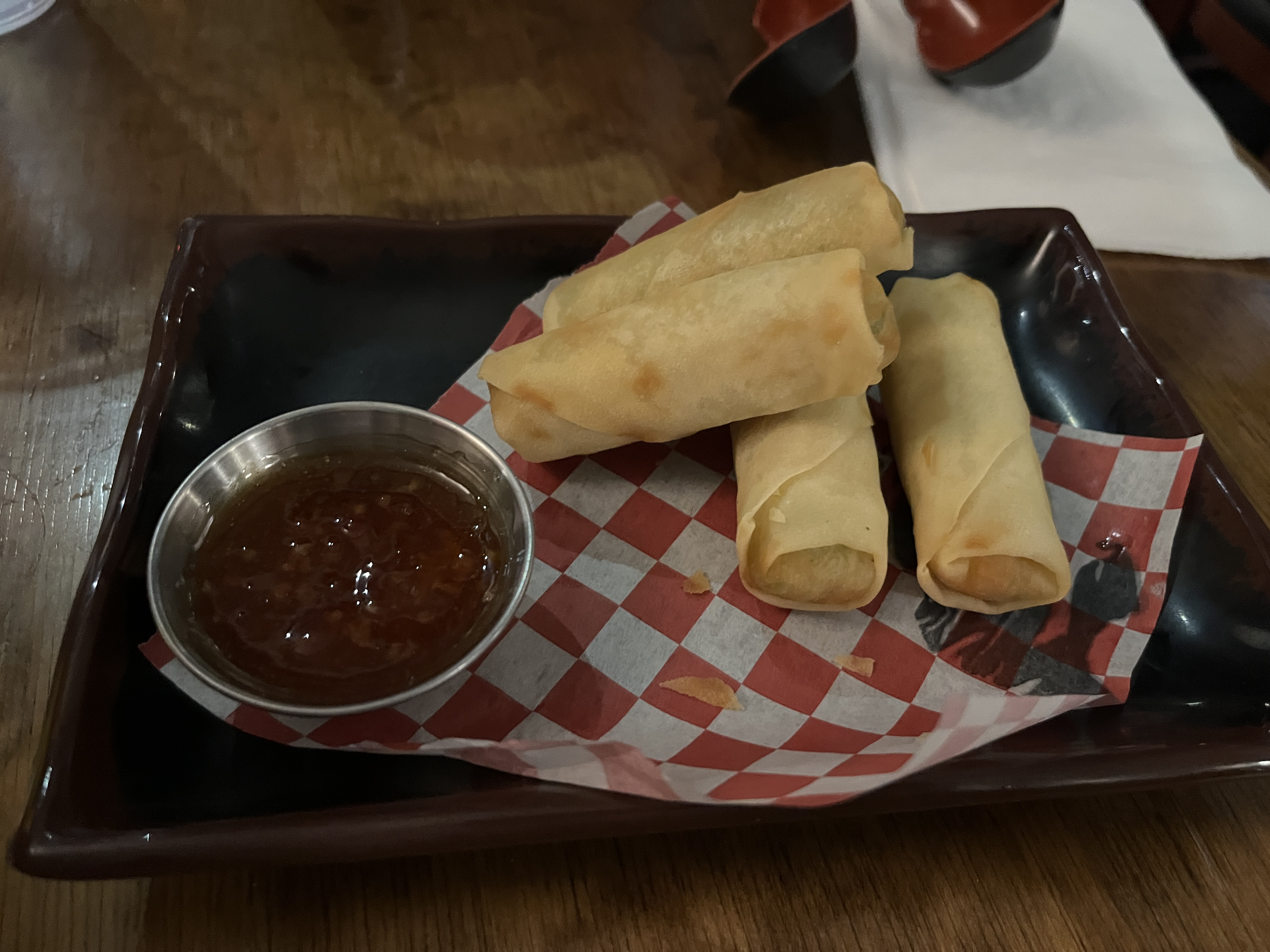
Vegetable spring rolls at the downtown Portland restaurant, 2022

Chef and owner Yoshinari Ichise opened the original Ramen Ryoma in Portland in 2016. Plans to open a restaurant on Southwest Morrison Street in downtown Portland were announced in 2021.

=== California ===
The first San Diego location opened in Kearny Mesa in 2018. The restaurant also operates in Pacific Beach (since late 2018) and Hillcrest. The Kearny Mesa location closed in early 2021.

== Reception ==
Rebekah Gonzalez included the Hillcrest restaurant in iHeart's 2021 list of "Where to Find the Best Ramen in San Diego". In 2022, Krista Garcia and Ron Scott of Eater Portland said Ramen Ryoma is a "worthy [place] to get a Japanese noodle fix in Beaverton". The website's Seiji Nanbu and Janey Wong included the restaurant in a 2022 overview of "Where to Find Knockout Ramen in Portland and Beyond".

== See also ==
- List of Japanese restaurants
