= Kevin Waters =

Kevin Waters or Walters may refer to:

- Kevin Waters (Jesuit), educator and priest
- Kevin Waters (politician), an American politician
- Kevin Walters, rugby league player and coach
