= Paul Matsudaira =

American biologist (born 1952)

- Born: June 30, 1952 (age 74); Seattle, Washington
- Education: University of Washington; Dartmouth College
- Spouse: Maureen Murray
- Children: 2

Paul Thomas Matsudaira (born June 30, 1952) is an American biologist who served as the head of the Department of Biological Sciences at the National University of Singapore from 2009 to 2017.

== Biography ==
Paul Matsudaira is the son of John Matsudaira, who was active as a painter mainly from the 1940s to the 1970s. During his childhood, his father gave him a rock for which he would observe from different sides. He graduated from O'Dea High School.

Matsudaira studied chemistry and later biology at the University of Washington and obtained a Doctor of Philosophy in biology from Dartmouth College in 1981. For his doctoral thesis, he studied the structure of the intestine brush border cytoskeleton and its functions. After further studies at the Max Planck Institute for Biophysical Chemistry in Germany and the Laboratory of Molecular Biology in England, he entered the MIT Department of Biology by joining the Whitehead Institute in 1985. While serving at Massachusetts Institute of Technology, Matsudaira contributed to the founding of NetBio, a company specializing in DNA analysis. He contributed to Methods in Cell Biology as a co-editor from 1991 to 2014. Before moving to NUS, he taught biology students at Singapore via online videos, and taught at study camps while on summer vacations.

In 2009, after 24 years at MIT, Matsudaira moved to NUS to replace Prakash Kumar as the head of the Department of Biological Sciences, a position which he held until 2017. During his tenure, he was responsible for establishing and directing the Centre of BioImaging Sciences and the Mechanobiology Institute. Regarding his decision to run the Department of Biological Services at NUS, Matsudaira stated that the scarcity of research funding in the United States is making the National Institutes of Health give grants "for less ambitious projects rather than forward-thinking, riskier science."

== Personal life ==
Matsudaira currently lives in Singapore with his wife Maureen Murray and their two children.

== Selected bibliography ==
- The Organization of the Intestine Brush Border Cytoskeleton (1981)()doctoral thesis)
- A Practical Guide to Protein and Peptide Purification for Microsequencing (1993)
- A Practical Guide to the Study of Calcium in Living Cells (1994)
- Video Microscopy (1998)
