= O'Dea High School =

School in Seattle in USA

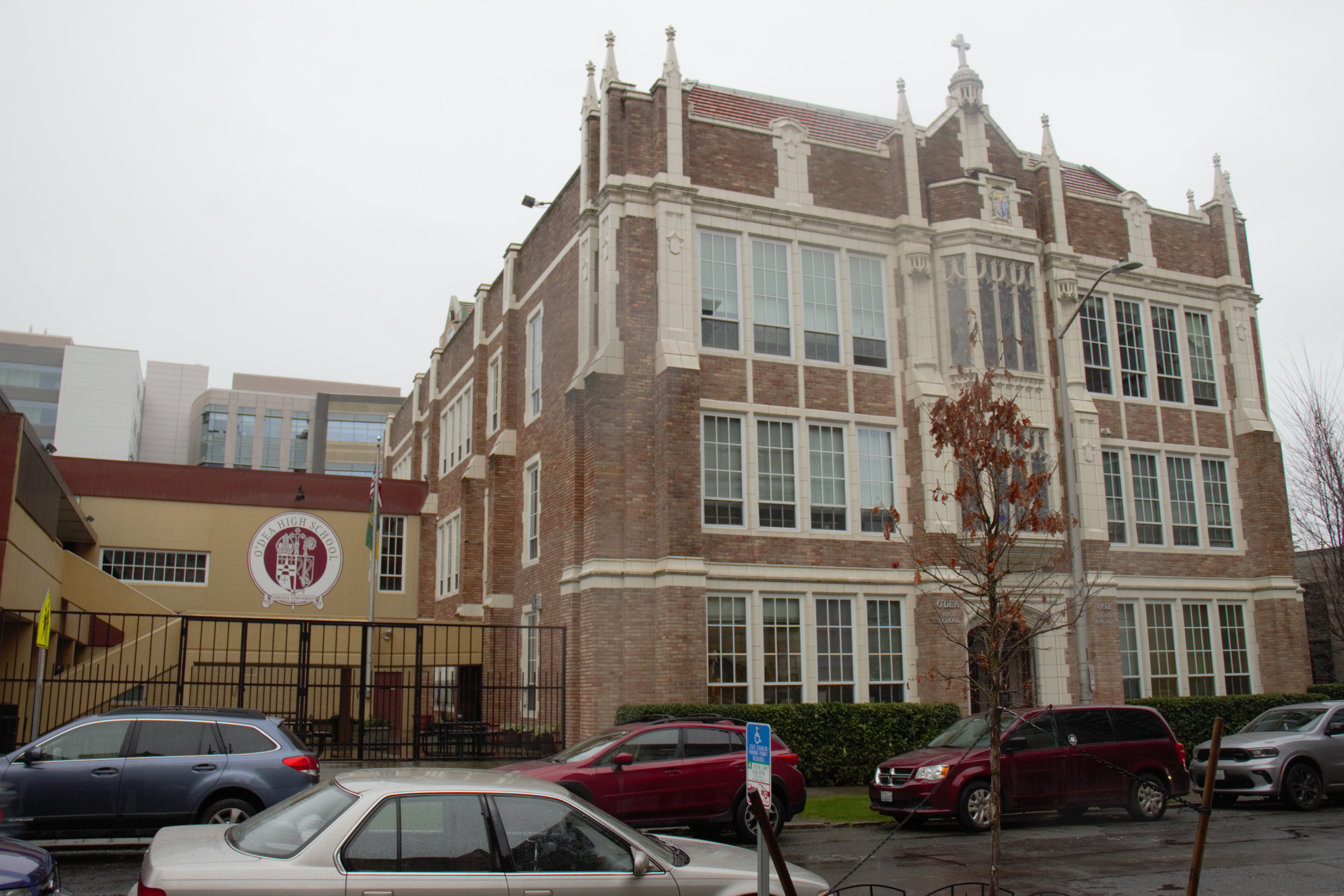

Location
- 802 Terry Avenue; Seattle, (King County), Washington 98104; United States; 47°36′28″N 122°19′29″W

Information
- Type: Private, Single-sex high school
- Motto: Omnia Omnibus (All Things to All Men)
- Religious affiliation: Catholic
- Established: 1923
- Oversight: Congregation of Christian Brothers
- CEEB code: 481130
- Dean: Keandre Magee
- Principal: James Walker
- Faculty: 36
- Grades: 9-12
- Enrollment: 507 (2020)
- Student to teacher ratio: 14:1
- Campus type: Urban
- Colors: Maroon and Gold
- Athletics conference: Metro 3A
- Sports: Football, Basketball, Baseball, Golf, Cross Country, Wrestling, Swim & Dive, Lacrosse, Soccer, Tennis, Track & Field
- Mascot: Irish
- Nickname: O'Dea
- Team name: Fighting Irish
- Accreditation: Northwest Accreditation Commission; State of Washington
- School fees: $500 (enrollment), $225 (books), $100 (art), $35 (choir)
- Tuition: $17,405
- Athletic Director: Monte Kohler
- Website: http://www.odea.org

O'Dea High School is a Catholic all boys high school founded in 1923 and is located in Seattle's First Hill neighborhood. The school is named after Edward John O'Dea who was bishop of Seattle when the school was built. O'Dea is a part of the Archdiocese of Seattle.

Of its 480 students in four grades in 2022, 56% were Catholics, 53% were Caucasian, 16% were African American, and 19% were multi-racial. There are 36 instructors and the student-teacher ratio is 14 to 1. The tuition at O'Dea High School for the 2023–2024 school year was $19,555; the school provides over $2 million in financial aid every year.

== Clubs ==
O'Dea High School has many school clubs, each supported and sponsored by the school by a yearly club fair and funds from the school's treasury. A list of some O'Dea Clubs:

- Black Students United For Excellence (BSUE)
- Latino Heritage Club
- O'Dea 100 Club
- Asian and Pacific Islander Heritage Club
- National Honor Society - O'Dea Chapter
- Junior State of America - O'Dea Chapter
- Knowledge Bowl Club
- Service Club
- Chess Club
- Student Ambassadors
- Rhythm & Poetry
- Student Advisors for Equity
- eSports
- Digital Media Club (DMC)
- Technology Ambassadors
- O’Dea Design Club

== Athletics ==
O'Dea High School has had many notable alumni go on to great success in College and Professional athletics. A list of currently offered sports by season:

- Fall: Cross Country, Football, Golf
- Winter: Basketball, Swimming, Wrestling
- Spring: Baseball, Golf, Lacrosse, Soccer, Tennis, Track

== Notable alumni ==
- Patrick Henry Brady, Major General, U.S. Army (retired), Vietnam Medal of Honor and Distinguished Service Cross recipient.
- Chris Banchero, current professional basketball player
- Paolo Banchero, NCAA basketball player for Duke and first overall pick in the 2022 NBA draft, currently playing for the Orlando Magic
- Gordon Bowker, co-founder of Starbucks and Redhook Brewery
- Kevin Burleson, NBA player
- Nate Burleson, NFL wide receiver
- Fred Couples, professional golfer
- Demetrius DuBose, former NFL player
- Myles Gaskin, American football running back for the Seattle Seahawks
- Allen Greene, director of athletics at the University of Pittsburgh and former baseball player for Notre Dame and the New York Yankees
- Charles Greene, U.S. Olympic gold medalist
- Vinnie Hacker, influencer and model
- Eddie Henderson, retired soccer player (Wichita Wings MISL team & US National Team Youth player); Washington Director of Youth Coaching for the ISC Gunners program
- Mitch Johnson, former professional basketball player and current head coach of the San Antonio Spurs
- Jamie Malonzo, current professional basketball player in the PBA
- John Matsudaira (1922–2007), American painter
- Mich Matsudaira (1937–2019), American businessman and civil rights activist
- Paul Matsudaira, American biologist
- Taylor Mays (born 1988), NFL free safety with Cincinnati Bengals; former USC Trojan
- John Navone, SJ, Jesuit priest, theologian, author, and retired professor emeritus of the Pontifical Gregorian University
- Clint Richardson Jr. (born 1956), NBA player
- Geoff "InControl" Robinson, American professional StarCraft player and commentator
- J. Kevin Waters, Jesuit priest, composer, academic administrator, and professor emeritus of Music at Gonzaga University
- DeAndre Yedlin (born 1993), full-back for MLS football club Inter Miami CF

== Controversies ==
In 2012, the principal of O'Dea at the time, Brother Walczak was accused of sexually abusing a minor in the 1970s. Walczak denied the allegations but resigned as principal.
