= Tomoko Moriguchi-Matsuno =

American businesswoman

- Born: Tomoko Moriguchi; August 25, 1945 (age 79); Newell, California, US
- Other names: Tomoko Matsuno
- Occupation: Businesswoman
- Years active: 1962 – present
- Employer: Uwajimaya
- Spouses: Koji Matsuno

Tomoko Moriguchi-Matsuno (née Moriguchi; born August 25, 1945), also known as Tomoko Matsuno, is an American businesswoman who was CEO of Uwajimaya from 2007 to 2017.

== Biography ==
Moriguchi-Matsuno was born at Tule Lake War Relocation Center, the youngest child of Fujimatsu Moriguchi and Sadako Tsutakawa. She is the niece of George Tsutakawa. Her family was interned at Tule Lake during World War II; Tomoko was the last of 1,490 children born there. After the war, the family moved to Seattle's Japantown, where Moriguchi-Matsuno's father re-established Uwajimaya on South Main Street in 1946.

Moriguchi-Matsuno succeeded to the position as CEO of Uwajimaya on September 24, 2007 after her older brother Tomio stepped down from the position. Prior to her appointment, she also was executive vice president of the organization. Besides her position as CEO, she also was president of Uwajimaya. During Moriguchi-Matsuno's tenure as CEO, Uwajimaya opened its store in Renton, Washington. It also moved one of its stores from Overlake to a new, larger location in Bellevue.

Along with Uwajimaya, Moriguchi-Matsuno presided over One Reel's board of directors.

Moriguchi-Matsuno stepped down from her position as CEO of Uwajimaya on February 24, 2017. Her family received the 2017 Tomodachi Award for their contributions to the relations between Japan and Seattle.
