= Mich Matsudaira =

American businessman and civil rights activist (1937–2019)

- Born: Martin Mitsuyuki Matsudaira; November 12, 1937; Seattle, Washington
- Died: March 24, 2019 (aged 81); Seattle, Washington
- Other names: Mitch Matsudaira
- Occupation: Businessman
- Years active: 1965 – 2003
- Spouses: Ruth Matsumoto (m. 1962; div. 1988)
- Children: 4
- Relatives: John Matsudaira (brother)

Martin Mitsuyuki "Mich" Matsudaira, also known as Mitch Matsudaira (November 12, 1937 – March 24, 2019), was an American businessman and civil rights activist.

== Biography ==
Matsudaira was born in Seattle on November 12, 1937, the son of Japanese immigrants Thomas and Theresa Matsudaira. His older brother, John Matsudaira, was a member of the Northwest School of artists. Following the signing of Executive Order 9066, he was interned with his family at Puyallup Assembly Center and then at Minidoka War Relocation Center during World War II. After returning to Seattle in 1945, he attended Immaculate Conception Elementary School and then O'Dea High School before serving in the United States Air Force as a refuelling specialist on tanker aircraft from 1955 to 1960. After receiving an honorable discharge, he attended the University of Washington, where he received a bachelor's degree in economics in 1965, and then Seattle University, where he obtained a master's degree in public administration in 1977. Matsudaira then worked at Boeing as an industrial engineer and manager for several years before taking his position as executive director of the Governor's Asian American Advisory Council in 1972.

Matsudaira opened Mich's Men's Shop on Jackson Street in Seattle's International District in 1976. He moved his business to Belltown and then to Pioneer Square before closing his shop in 1990. He then returned to Boeing as a financial analyst. He was recognized for his 20 years of experience with Boeing in 2002. He retired from the company on March 1, 2003.

In 1972, Matsudaira, along with other Asian American activists, established the Governor's Asian American Advisory Council, which he headed as executive director. In 1973, he was appointed to a committee reviewing the affirmative action plan on employment opportunities of minority residents by Governor Daniel J. Evans. On May 13, 1974, after the council was renamed the Commission on Asian American Affairs, Matsudaira was one of the speakers at an Asian American awareness workshop hosted by Evergreen State College. On February 19, 1976, he was present in the Cabinet Room when President Gerald Ford signed a proclamation nullifying Executive Order 9066. He resigned his position on the council in 1978 in protest against Governor Dixy Lee Ray. He was a member of the Seattle chapter of the Japanese American Citizens League, and served as its president in 1979. During his tenure, when several Japanese residents of Idaho opposed the plans by the Seattle JACL to construct a replica guard tower in Minidoka and burn it on October 13, Matsudaira claimed that the members of the Idaho JACL chapter are "not the custodians of history of Minidoka." Due to opposition, the Seattle chapter did not attend the dedication ceremony on August 18 and the plan was later abandoned. Matsudaira later joined the National Council for Japanese American Redress, which he supported financially.

Matsudaira died on March 24, 2019.

== Bibliography ==
- Memoirs of Theresa Hotoru Matsudaira, 1902–1996 (2006)

== See also ==
- Tomio Moriguchi
