= Sadako Moriguchi =

- 森口 貞子
- Born: Sadako Tsutakawa; October 16, 1907; Seattle, Washington, US
- Died: July 25, 2002 (aged 94)
- Occupation: Businesswoman
- Years active: 1932 – 1992
- Employer: Uwajimaya
- Known for: Co-founding Uwajimaya
- Spouses: Fujimatsu Moriguchi (m. 1932; died 1962)
- Children: Kenzo Moriguchi; Suwako Maeda; Tomio Moriguchi; Akira Moriguchi; Hisako Nakaya; Toshi Moriguchi; Tomoko Matsuno

Sadako Moriguchi (森口 貞子, Moriguchi Sadako; née Tsutakawa, October 16, 1907 – July 25, 2002) was an American businesswoman who helped establish Uwajimaya with her husband, Fujimatsu Moriguchi.

== Biography ==
Sadako was born as the second daughter of Shozo Tsutakawa in Seattle in 1907. Her younger brother was George Tsutakawa. Although she spent her childhood in Seattle, she went to Japan for formal education.

On October 20, 1932, Sadako married Fujimatsu Moriguchi in Tacoma, Washington. According to family tradition, Sadako's father arranged a marriage with Fujimatsu. Sadako helped open the first Uwajimaya store in Tacoma. During World War II, the Moriguchis were interned at Pinedale, California, where Sadako gave birth to a daughter, and then at Tule Lake, where she gave birth to two children. After the war, the family moved to Seattle's Japantown, where they set up Uwajimaya again at a small building on South Main Street.

In 1962, Uwajimaya made exhibitions at the Century 21 Exposition by opening a gift shop. After Fujimatsu died that same year in August, he left his business to his sons. The brothers eventually shared their ownership with their sisters and their mother, who continued working at Uwajimaya with her children until the age of 85. However, for the next 40 years after her husband's death, Moriguchi still attended to the customers of Uwajimaya, mostly in the company's gift operations, even though she did not serve in an official position. She was selected as one of eleven Northwest women of Japanese ancestry to feature in the exhibition "Strength and Diversity: Japanese American Women 1885-1990" at the Burke Museum. Moriguchi spent her last days at Seattle's Keiro Nursing Home. She died from complications of Alzheimer's disease on July 25, 2002.

A café at Uwajimaya's store in Bellevue, Sadako's Café, was named for Moriguchi.
