= North American Post =

The North American Post
- Type: Newspaper
- Owner: Tomio Moriguchi
- Publisher: North American Post Publishing, Inc.
- Founded: 1902
- Language: Japanese / English
- Headquarters: 519 6th Ave South; Seattle, Washington 98105; United States
- Website: napost.com

The North American Post (Japanese: 北米報知, Hepburn: Hokubei Hōchi) is a newspaper based in Seattle, Washington's International District. It was founded in 1902 and is the largest and oldest Japanese-language newspaper published in the Pacific Northwest.

== Before World War II ==
Originally called the Hokubei JiJi (The North American Times), the newspaper was founded in 1902 by first generation immigrants and investors Kiyoshi Kumamoto, Kuranosuke Hiraide, Juji Yadagai, and Ichiro Yamamoto. Its chief editor was Sakutaro Yamada, and its original office was located in the basement of Hiraide Shoten on Jackson Street. The early paper focused on both regional and international topics of importance to the local Japanese community, and provided a space to publish community obituaries, marriage announcements, and other notices.

In 1913, ownership of the paper was transferred from Kiyoshi Kumamoto to Sumikiyo Arima and Shoichi Suginoo. Suginoo sold his interest in the paper to Arima in 1918, before returning to Japan. Arima's sons Sumiyoshi and Sumio both served as president of the paper during the years leading up to World War II.

Peak daily circulation of the North American Times was about 9,000. Commemorations for the paper's 5,000th and 10,000th issues were held in 1918 and 1934 respectively. Prior to World War II, the North American Times employed around 50 staff and correspondents.

The paper was issued daily from 1902 until March 12, 1942, when it ceased publication due to the internment of its staff and core readership. It was the only Japanese language newspaper in the United States to publish on December 8, 1941, the day after the Japanese attack on Pearl Harbor. This took place in spite of managing editor Sumio Arima being arrested by the FBI on the previous day.

== After World War II ==
Following World War II, in 1946, the paper was restarted under the name Hokubei Hochi (The North American Post). Its publishers was Sadahiko Ikoma and Kunizo Maeno. Sumio Arima returned briefly as editor-in-chief.

From 1946 to the end of 1948 the North American Post was issued weekly and then started publishing three times a week. In March 1950, it increased to a daily issued five days a week. At the end of 1950s, newspaper circulation was about 3,000.

In 1951, Henry Takemitsu Kubota became the Post's publisher. He received the Fourth Class Order of the Sacred Treasure in 1975 in recognition of his work. Kubota remained publisher until his retirement in 1979.

In 1960, associate editor Takami Hibiya became the paper's editor after Haruo Hashiguchi died. He held the position until his retirement in 1984. Japan’s Prime Minister Takeo Miki’s friendship with Hibiya gave Hibiya special access during Miki’s visit and resulted in a special Post edition covering the Prime Minister’s activities in Seattle.

In March, 1981, the newspaper reduced its frequency to three times a week. In July of that year, the Post suspended production for the first time since World War II. A group of community investors rallied to provide an infusion of funds, and the paper reorganized as The North American Post Publishing Company. Yoshito Fujii was named its president and publisher. One of the investors, former Uwajimaya CEO Tomio Moriguchi, later became the paper's publisher and president.

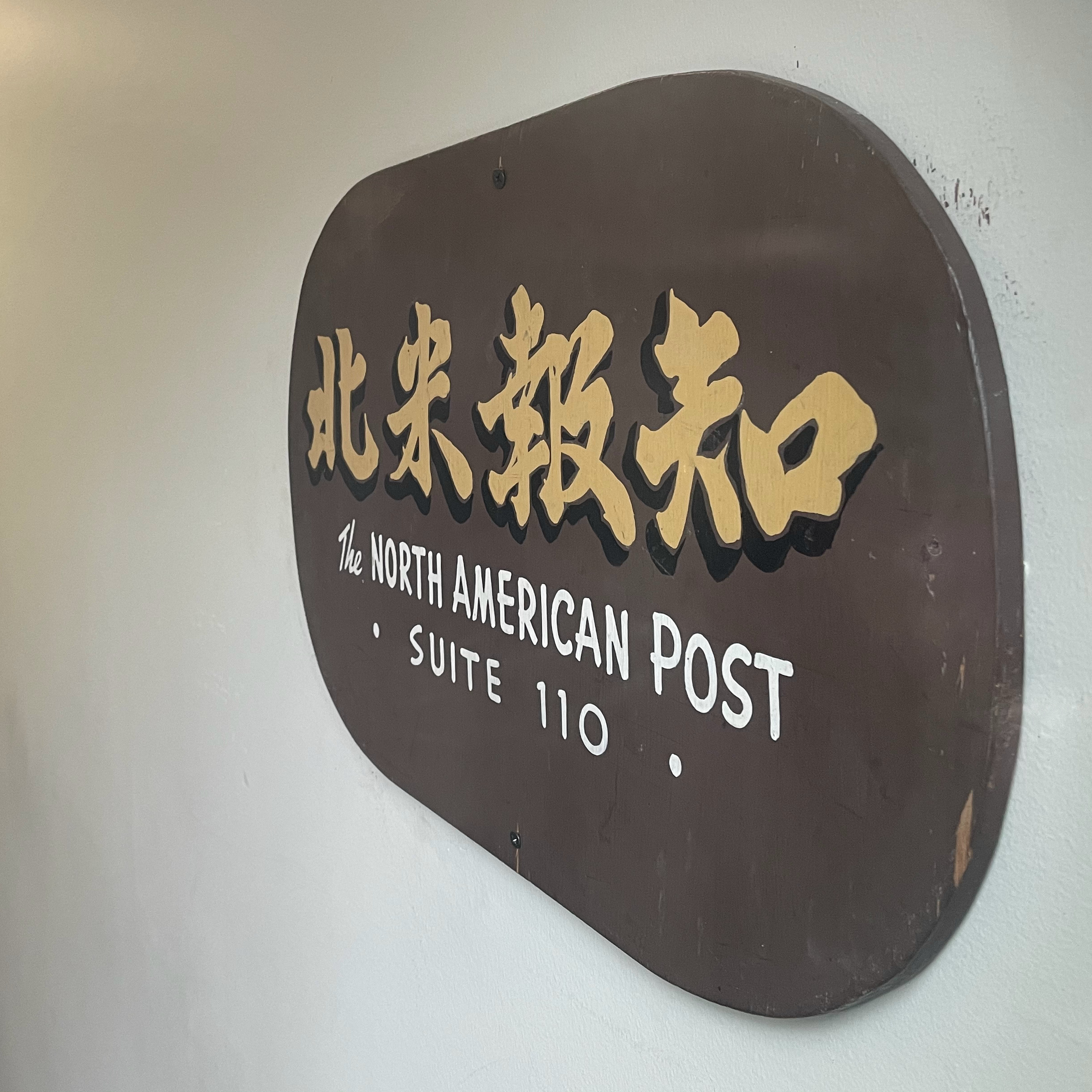
Sign for the North American Post in their office in Seattle

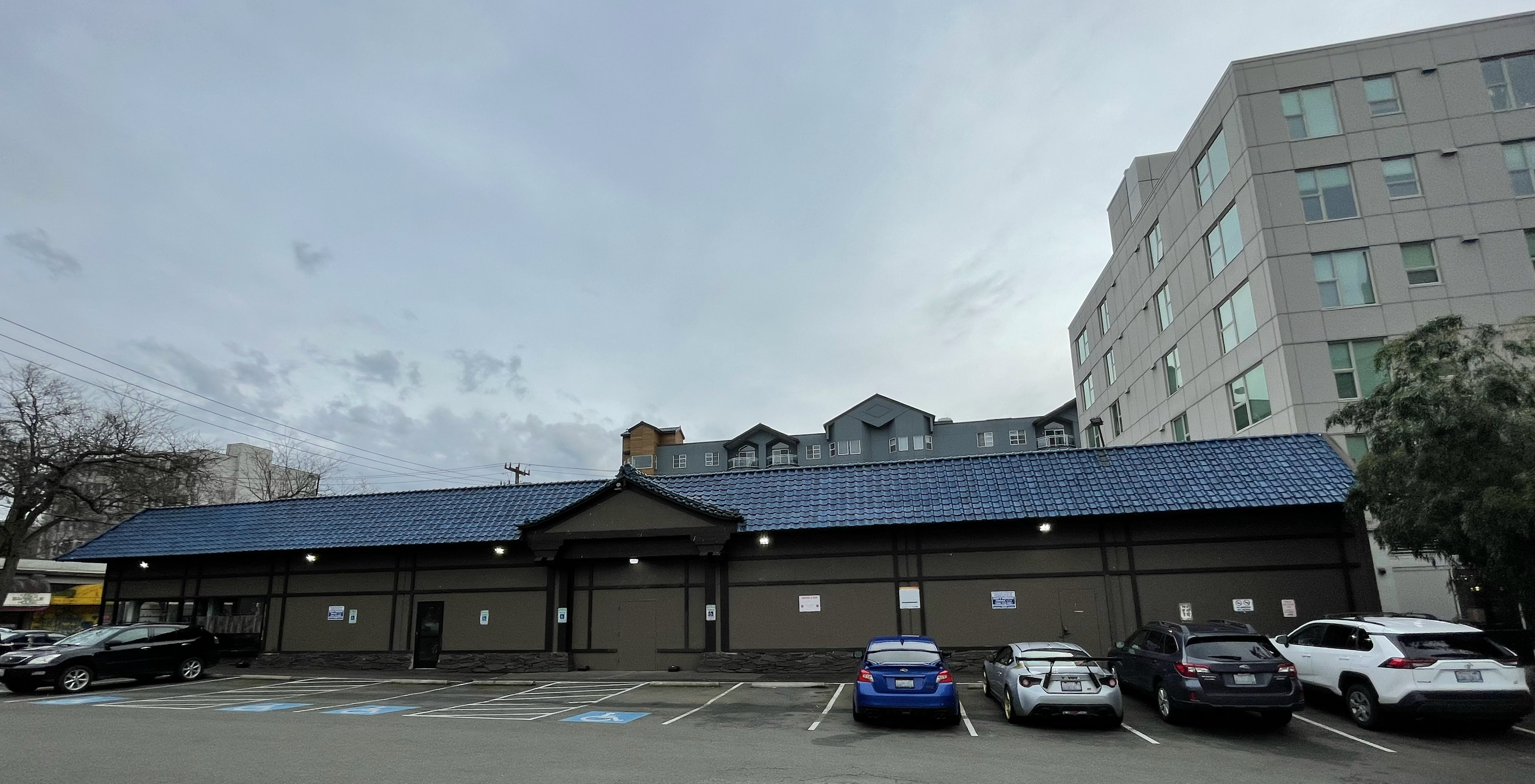
Nagomi Plaza, the location of the North American Post in Seattle

In 2001, the Post relocated its office to its current site, the original Seattle location of the Asian supermarket Uwajimaya in Seattle's Chinatown-International District. The paper now puts out two issues a week: the Saturday edition is Japanese-only; the Wednesday edition has both English and Japanese sections.

On November 16, 2015, the Hokubei Hochi Foundation announced that digitized issues of both Hokubei Jiji (North American Times) and Hokubei Hochi (North American Post) would be made available to the public online. This is a result of "nearly four years of work by sponsors Hokubei Hochi Foundation, University of Washington Libraries (Suzzallo and Paul Allen) and Digital Initiatives".

== See also ==
- History of the Japanese in Seattle
- The Nikkei Newspapers Digital Archive (NNDA), is a project of the Hokubei Hochi (North American Post) Foundation and the University of Washington Libraries. Digital copies of past issues of the newspapers, North American Times (1902-1942) and North American Post (1946-1950) are available here.
