= Kevin Waters (Jesuit) =

American Jesuit priest

J. Kevin Waters, SJ
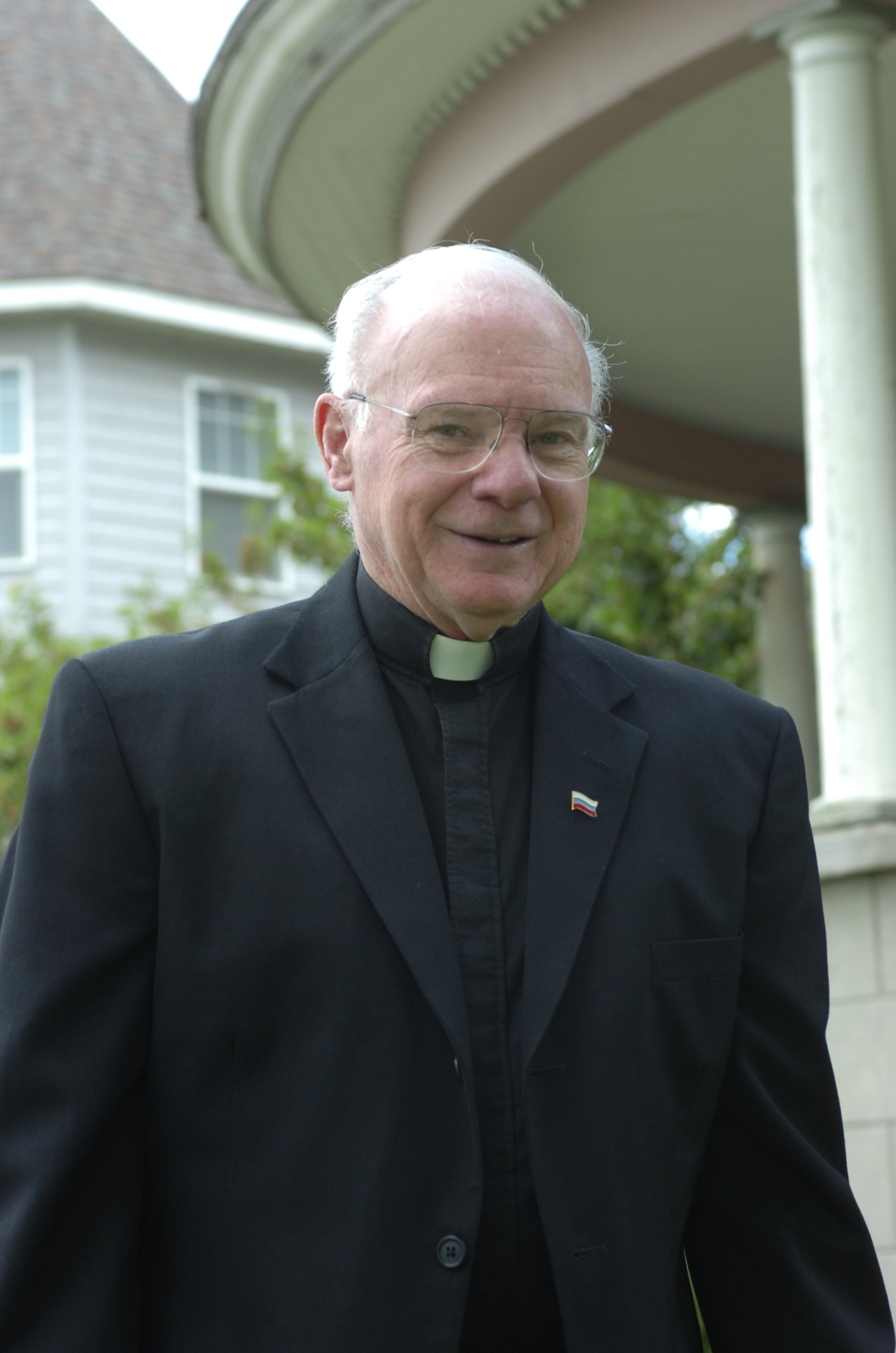
- J. Kevin Waters, SJ outside the Gonzaga Music Building
- Born: June 24, 1933 (age 92); Seattle, WA
- Education: University of California, Los Angeles; Gonzaga University (BA); Mount Saint Michael Seminary (MA); University of Washington (BA, DMA); Santa Clara University (STB, MA)
- Occupations: Retired Academic Dean and Professor Emeritus

J. Kevin Waters S.J. (born June 24, 1933) is a Jesuit priest, composer, educator, and retired Academic Dean (Emeritus) of the College of Arts and Sciences of Gonzaga University in Spokane, Washington.

== Early life ==
John Kevin Waters was born June 24, 1933, in Seattle, WA, the third child of Thomas Waters and Eleanor (Hynes) Waters. He has an older sister, Maribeth, an older brother, Thomas, and a younger sister, Kathleen. He began his education at Sacred Heart School in Seattle and Showalter Grade School in Riverton Heights, WA. During high school he was a student at O'Dea High School and Seattle Preparatory School, from which he graduated in 1951. That same year, he entered the Society of Jesus.

== Education ==
Waters began his studies at Gonzaga University in Spokane, WA in 1953, earning the degree Bachelor of Arts in 1957. He then began graduate studies at Gonzaga's Mount St. Michael Seminary, earning his Master of Arts in Philosophy in 1958. From 1958 until 1970 he studied composition privately with John Verrall, Niccolo Castiglione and George McKay. Because of his interest in Music, Waters earned a second Bachelor of Arts in music from the University of Washington in 1964. Moving to Los Angeles that year, he also studied privately with Roy Harris at UCLA while working toward his S.T.B (Bachelor of Sacred Theology) and Master of Arts in Theology at Santa Clara University, graduating with those degrees in 1965.

Waters earned the D.M.A. (Doctor of Musical Arts) in Composition from the University of Washington in 1970. His dissertation included several works composed during his studies there. During his doctoral studies, in the years 1967–1968, Waters served as a lecturer at the university's School of Music.

In 1980, Waters did 30 hours of study in Arts Management at Shoreline Community College, the course conducted by Dr. Michael Warlum, PhD.

Waters has continuously been a Member of the American Guild of Organists since 1957.

== Academic career ==
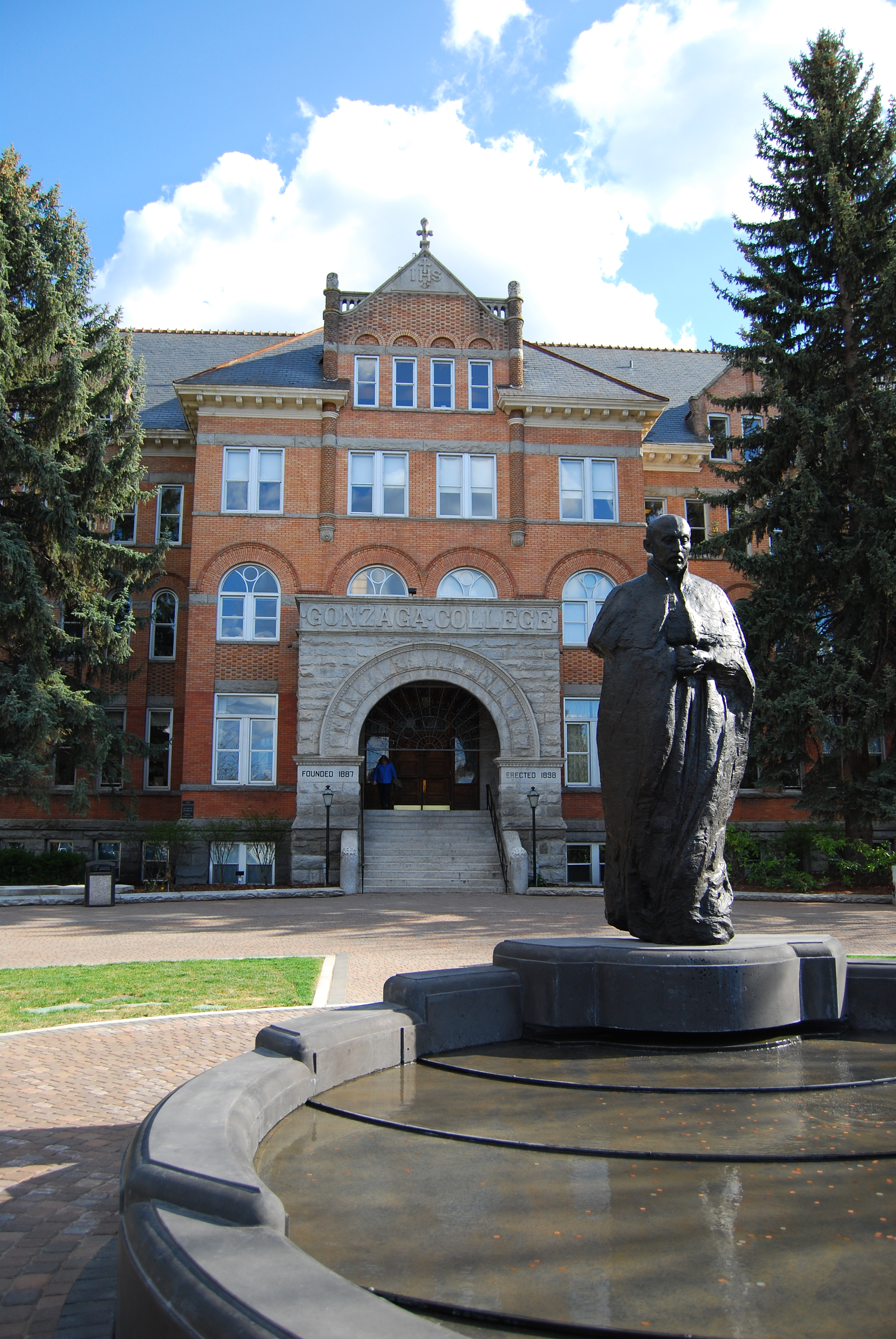
The main entrance to College Hall at Gonzaga University

Remaining in Seattle, Waters became Assistant Professor of Music at nearby Seattle University in 1969 while completing his dissertation, and held that academic rank until 1974. In 1970 he did post-graduate studies in avant-garde compositional techniques with Italian composer Bruno Bartolozzi in Florence, and he additionally worked as Visiting Professor of Music for Gonzaga-in-Florence until 1972.

In 1974 Waters was tenured as Associate Professor of Music at Seattle University, working there until 1980. He also served on the Summer Faculty of Creighton University in 1977 through 1980.

In 1981, Waters was promoted to Professor of Fine Arts at Seattle University, remaining there until 1983, when he accepted a position as Professor of Music and Dean of the College of Arts an Sciences at Gonzaga. In the academic year 1985–1986, Waters was Acting Academic Vice-president at Gonzaga. He continued as Professor and Dean at Gonzaga until his retirement in 1996 at which time he was awarded the title Professor Emeritus of Music.

Waters has served on the boards of the following institutions (in reverse chronological order):

2009–Present Board of Members, Gonzaga University (Presiding Officer 10/28/09)

2006-09 Board of Trustees, Spokane Symphony Orchestra

2004-09 Priestly Formation Council for the Catholic Diocese of Spokane

1997-08 Board of Trustees, Gonzaga University

1984-91 Board of Members, Gonzaga University

1978-83 Board of Trustees, Seattle University, 2nd term and 3rd term (also: 1971–1974).

1976-77 Academic Council, Seattle University

1975-83 Board of Members, Matteo Ricci College

1975-83 Board of Members, Seattle University

1975- American Society of University Composers

1974-80 Executive Committee, Jesuit Institute for the Arts

1971-74 Board of Trustees, Seattle University

1970-78 Seattle Archdiocesan Music Commission

== Religious career ==
J. Kevin Waters entered the Jesuits in 1951, at the age of 18 years at the St. Francis Xavier Novitiate in Sheridan, OR. Waters was ordained in June, 1964. He has spent his entire career in the Jesuits working for their educational institutions as a professor, Administrator, and Composer-in-Residence.

== Compositions ==
=== Selected list of published works ===
2008 "Regina Coeli,” for organ and treble instrument. Morning Star, St. Louis, MO

2008 "Adoro Te Devote,”for organ and treble instrument. Morning Star, St. Louis, MO

2008 "Alleluia, Tone 6," for organ and treble instrument. Morning Star, St. Louis, MO

2007 "Concordi Laetitia,”organ solo based on Gregorian Chant, CanticaNOVA, WV

2007 "Veni, Veni Emmanuel,”organ solo based on Gregorian Chant, CanticaNOVA, WV

2004 "Veni Creator Spiritus,” for organ and treble instrument, GIA, Chicago, IL

2004 “Ave Maria” organ solo based on Gregorian Chant, CanticaNOVA, Charles Town WV

2004 "Ave Verum Corpus” organ solo based on Gregorian Chant, CanticaNOVA

2002 “In Paradisum” Postlude for Funerals in Consoliere Classic, Vol. V WLP, Schiller Park

1997 “Sleep, Holy Babe” SATB with flute, World Library Publications, Schiller Park, IL.

1997 "To Christ the Paschal Victim" SATB, A Cappella; Morning Star, St. Louis, MO

1996 "Fantasy on Jesus Christ is Risen Today" Organ Solo; Morning Star, St. Louis

1996 "Wexford Carol" Flute and SATB; Morning Star, St. Louis.

1996 "Variations on In Dulci Jubilo" Organ Solo; Morning Star, St. Louis.

1995 "Under a Soft Rain" (Brass Quintet) Pocono Mountain Music Pub., Tobyhanna, PA

1995 "In Dulci Jubilo" Publ. Pocono Mountain Music Publishing, Tobyhanna

1994 "Appalachian Carol" Publ. Walton Music Corp., Ft. Lauderdale

1987 "Mass of Jubilee" Publ. Epoch Universal Publications, Phoenix

1982 "My Soul Alive, My God" Publ. Epoch Universal Publications, Phoenix

1982 "Make God Music" Publ: Epoch Universal Publications, Phoenix

1970 "Psalm of Entreaty" Publ: Church Music Assn of America, Cambridge, MA

1967 "Mary, Mother of the Church," Publ: G.I.A., Toledo, Ohio

1967 "Psalm of Thanksgiving" Publ: McLaughlin & Reilly Co.

1965 "Mass of the American Martyrs" Publ: McLaughlin & Reilly Co.

=== Premieres and performances ===
2025 Garment of Praise; premiere, Myrtle Woldson Performing Arts Center, Spokane, WA, February 7, 2025.

2009 I Sing Ballads for Breakfast Alone for the Charm of Them; premiere, Metaline Falls, Washington, February 14, 2009, with Paul Grove, guitarist.

2007 Spring, a song by Kevin Waters, was performed at Holy Rosary Catholic Church, Seattle, Washington, by Glenn Guhr, baritone soloist, and the Northwest Symphony Orchestra, Anthony Spain, music director, on March 10, 2007.

2007 The Cataldo Trio, performed at the Aaron Copland School of Music, Queens College, New York, for the Society of Composers Inc. New Music Festival, 2007.

2006 August 27, 2006 Spring, a song by Kevin Waters, was performed at Henderson State University, Oklahoma, by Robert Best, baritone, and Elvia Puccinelli, piano.

September 15, 2006 Spring, a song by Kevin Waters, was performed during the 2006 National Conference of the Society of Composers, Inc at Trinity University, San Antonio, Texas, by Robert Best, baritone, and Elvia Puccinelli, piano.

September 24, 2006 Spring, a song by Kevin Waters, was performed at the University of North Texas, Texas, by Robert Best, baritone, and Elvia Puccinelli, piano.

September 30, 2006 Prelude on Veni Creator Spiritus, a piece for Organ and Trumpet by Kevin Waters, was performed at the concert Music in Jesuits, Spring Hill College, Mobile, Alabama, by Shane Courville, S.J., trumpet, and Kevin Waters, S.J., organ.

October 23, 2006 Aloysius Overture (Sinfonia Aloysiana), a piece for orchestra by Kevin Waters, was performed at MET Performing Arts Center, Spokane, by the Gonzaga Symphony Orchestra, Kevin Hekmatpanah, music director.

December 9, 2006 See Amid the Winter Snow, a choral carol by Kevin Waters, was performed at St. Cecilia Catholic Church, Bainbridge Island, Washington, by the Bainbridge Chorale, Anthony Spain, music director. Further performances were given on December 8, at Liberty Bay Presbyterian Church, Poulsbo, and on December 10, at Rolling Bay Presbyterian Church, Bainbridge Island.

2001 Psalm 150 for Mixed Chorus and Symphonic Band (2001), with James Bowyer and the Gonzaga University Choir and Robert Spittal with the Gonzaga University Symphonic Band; Robert Spittal, conductor; Gonzaga University Music Department's Gala Concert, St. Aloysius Church, Spokane, April 27, 2001.

1999 Waumandee Township, concerto for Organ, Winds, Brass and Percussion; American Guild of Organists regional convention, Spokane, July 7, 1999,

1996 The Cataldo Trio, trio for Flute, Cello, and Piano; The Met, Nov. 14, 1996

1996 Clare Symphony, Gonzaga U. Symphony Orchestra; The Met, Oct. 23, 1996

1992 Television premiere of Dear Ignatius, Dear Isabel, an opera; telecast by KSPS-TV, Spokane's PBS affiliate, February, 1992.

1991 Psalm 150 for Symphonic Band and Choir; world premiere at Scranton University, Scranton, Pennsylvania, April, 1991.

1987 First Symphony, Colorado State University Orchestra; Will Schwartz, Conductor, December, 1987; Fort Collins, Colorado.

1982 Mass of Jubilee, joint premiers in Seattle and Spokane.

1978 Dear Ignatius, Dear Isabel, an opera; Baltimore, Maryland, May, 1978; three performances.

1976 Sinfonia for Independence Day, overture; Seattle Symphony Orchestra, Milton Katims, Conductor; April, 1976.

1974 The Eye of the Quetzal, a play with songs and incidental music; Guadalajara, Mexico; three performances July, 1974.

1972 Job, a musico-drama; Villa Mondragone, Frascati, Italy; July, 1972.

1971 The Mask of Hiroshima, a play with music; three performances, University of Santa Clara, California.

1973 A Solemn Liturgy, St. Mary's Cathedral, San Francisco; July, 1973.

1964 Inversnaid, a choral song for two sopranos, women's chorus and chamber orchestra; College of Notre Dame, Belmont, California; May, 1964.

== Discography ==
2008 Spring, on Portraits: Songs for Soprano, Baritone and Piano, CD recording, 2008, with Lynn Eustis, Soprano; Robert Best, Baritone; and Elvia Puccinelli, Piano. Performers Recording Series 3, Society of Composers, Inc., Capstone Records: CPS-8792.

2007 The Cataldo Trio, on New Music Festival, Concert 3, CD recording, 2007, Aaron Copland School of Music, Queens College, New York.

2005 Ave Verum, on Composers of the Northwest, CD recording, June, 2005, with Dr. Janet Satre Ahrend at First English Lutheran Church, Billings, Montana, for the Regional Convention of the American Guild of Organists.

2005 Ave Verum, on A Recital of Northwest Composers, CD recording, September, 2005, with Dr. Janet Satre Ahrend at The Cathedral of Saint John the Evangelist, Spokane, Washington.

2005 Lines from Shakespeare, on SCI: Society of Composers, Inc. Concerts I&II, CD recording, October, 2005, with Gonzaga University Wind Ensemble, Robert Spittal, conductor, for Region VIII Conference of the Society of Composers, Inc., at the University of Montana, Missoula.

2004 String Quartet: The Florentine (1969) The Nevsky Quartet of St. Petersburg, Russia, issued a CD recording in 2004. The work demonstrates multiphonics, controlled oscillations, and other avant-garde techniques developed in the nineteen sixties. Waters composed the quartet while he was studying with Bruno Bartolozzi in Florence, Italy, in 1969. The Kronos Quartet gave the premiere of the five-movement work in Seattle in 1973. A reviewer of that concert wrote that in the "exploration of each instrument as an entity–and the seemingly endless effects each can achieve–one feels as if [the composer] is manipulating the inner ear, and the listener’s sense of balance so that one reacts in a subtle though physical manner: not toe-tapping physical, but an inner torso movement that for this listener was completely involuntary and memorably image-provoking."

1999 Riffs, Echoes, and Rhapsodies (1999); Duo for Guitar and Violoncello, with Paul Grove, guitar, and Kevin Hekmatpanah, violoncello, on Paul Grove in Recital, a CD produced by JB's Musical Services, Spokane, December, 1999.

1999 Waumandee Township (1999); Concerto for Organ, Winds Brass and Percussion, with Joseph Adam, organ, Robert Spittal, conductor, and members of the Spokane Symphony Orchestra, a CD produced by JMW, Spokane, July, 1999.

1998 A Divine Image, Song with text by William Blake, with Erik Oland, S.J., Canadian Baritone, and Kevin Waters, S.J., pianist, on Belvedere College, S.J. The Spirit of Belvedere, a CD produced and distributed by Belvedere College, Dublin, Ireland, 1998.

1998 Sleep, Holy Babe, and Wexford Carol. On Christmas at Gonzaga, a CD of music by Gonzaga University's Choir, Spokane, produced December, 1998.

1995 “To Christ the Paschal Victim.” On Encore, a CD of music by Gonzaga University's Choir, Spokane, produced December, 1995.

1987 Mass of Jubilee, a vinyl recording and audio tape recording produced and distributed by Epoch Universal Publications, Phoenix, 1987.

== Bibliography ==
=== Publications ===
2008 "Wielding Hopkins Into Song." The Hopkins Quarterly, Vol. XXXV, Nos. 3–4, Summer-Fall 2008, St. Joseph University Press, Philadelphia.

2000 Worship Music: A Concise Dictionary, Edward Foley, Editor, A Michael Glazier Book, The Liturgical Press, Collegeville, Minnesota, 2000; Contributors include J. Kevin Waters.

1999 "Evoking Justice in the Pursuit of Art: The Fine Arts, the Constitutions, and GC 34." In Promises Renewed, ed. Martin R. Tripole, S.J. Chicago, Illinois: Loyola Press, 1999.

1998 "Two Plays from the Green Side." America (Vol 178 No 6), February 28, 1998: 24.

1988 Music critic and reviewer since 1977 for Pastoral Music, Washington, D.C. Recent reviews of scores: February–March 1986, Vol. 10, No. 3; October–November 1986, Vol. II, No. 1.

1978 "Recruiting: The Few, The Proud." Pastoral Music Notebook, Nov. 1978, Vol. 2:5.

1775 "Can We Ever Have a Solemn Liturgy Again?" New Catholic World, Jan/Feb 1975, Vol. 218, No. 1303.

1973 "Church Music Congress in Bern," Sacred Music, Summer, 1973, Vol. 100, No. 2.

1969 "Chronicle: Experiment in Rome," Worship, April 1969.

1965 "Needed: A Roy Harris Renaissance," America, Dec. 18, 1965, Vol. 113, No. 25.

1959 Founding book editor for Our Times, newspaper for Diocese of Yakima, Ray Ruppert, editor.

=== Selected lectures ===
2000 “The Church Renews Its Musical Values,” a workshop presented to the Yakima Chapter, AGO, March 4. 2000.

1997 "Composing an Opera," lecture-demonstration for Opera Buffs, Spokane, WA.

1996 "Assessing Outcomes of Jesuit Education," Address to the university, Gonzaga

1977-79 Liturgical Music Workshop, given annually at Our Lady of Peace College, Montecito, California.

1978 "The Eye of the Composer," Pre-concert lecture for Seattle Symphony Orchestra, Oct. 23–24, 1978.

1976 "Church Music USA: Three Portraits and a Scheme," lecture for the Guild Service, American Guild of Organists, Seattle Chapter, Feb. 8, 1976.

1975 "Charles Ives and American Romanticism," Women's University Club, Seattle.

1974 "Liturgy's Words and Music: Old Skins for New Wine?" American Guild of Organists, Seattle Chapter, Nov. 11, 1974.
