= Tomio Moriguchi =

American businessman and civil rights activist

- 森口 富雄
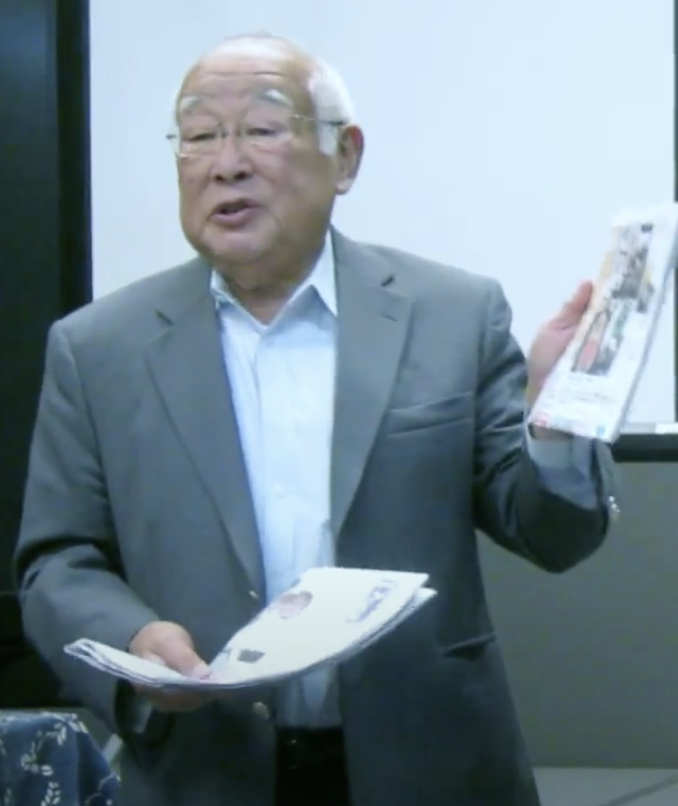
- Moriguchi in 2013
- Born: April 16, 1936 (age 90); Tacoma, Washington, US
- Occupation: Businessman
- Years active: 1961 – present
- Known for: Uwajimaya
- Spouses: Lovett Moriguchi (died 1991) Jenny Yan Li
- Children: 2
- Parent(s): Fujimatsu Moriguchi (father); Sadako Tsutakawa (mother)

Tomio Moriguchi (森口 富雄, Moriguchi Tomio; born 1936) is an American businessman and civil rights activist who was CEO of the Uwajimaya supermarket chain in Seattle, Washington, from 1965 to 2007.

== Biography ==
Moriguchi was born in Tacoma, Washington, to Fujimatsu Moriguchi and Sadako Tsutakawa. He is the nephew of George Tsutakawa. During World War II, following the signing of Executive Order 9066, his family was interned at Pinedale, California, and then at Tule Lake. After the war, the family moved to Seattle's Japantown where Moriguchi's father re-established Uwajimaya on South Main Street.

After graduating from the University of Washington with a degree in mechanical engineering, Moriguchi worked at Boeing as an engineer, but left after his father's death to run Uwajimaya. He was CEO and president of Uwajimaya beginning in 1965. During his tenure, he moved Uwajimaya's base of operations several times, expanding the size of his business in various locations until moving to Uwajimaya Village in 2000. He was the president of the Seattle chapter of the Japanese American Citizens League in 1972. He was also a member of the National Council for Japanese American Redress (NCJAR). Moriguchi, along with Kristi Yamaguchi, was honored by the JACL as a "Japanese American of the Biennium" in 1992. In 1994, the Washington State Legislature adopted a bill which honored Moriguchi.

After stepping down as CEO of Uwajimaya in 2007, Moriguchi continued as chairman. On June 18, 2015, he visited Ehime University to discuss internship programs for students in the United States. He was named by Puget Sound Business Journal as one of the 35 most influential business leaders of Seattle for the past 35 years. Moriguchi retired from the management of the company in 2017. He continues to be involved in the company's real estate branch. His family received the 2017 Tomodachi Award for their contributions to the relations between Japan and Seattle.

Although he did not own Nagomi Tea House, Moriguchi founded it on Uwajimaya's former business site. He accepted his position as president of Keiro Northwest, of which he was a co-founder, in 2018. He and his family were named as recipients of the 2020 Seattle-King County First Citizen Award.

Moriguchi is the board president and treasurer of the Hokubei Hochi Foundation and president of the North American Post Publishing Company (and former publisher). His daughter Denise is president and CEO of Uwajimaya.

== See also ==
- Mich Matsudaira
