= Fujimatsu Moriguchi =

Japanese-born American businessman

- 森口 富士松
- Born: 1898; Yawatahama, Ehime, Japan
- Died: 1962 (aged 63–64)
- Occupation: Businessman
- Years active: 1928 – 1962
- Employer: Uwajimaya
- Known for: Founding Uwajimaya
- Spouses: Sadako Tsutakawa (m. 1932)
- Children: 7

Fujimatsu Moriguchi (森口 富士松, Moriguchi Fujimatsu; 1898 – August 1962) was a Japanese-born American businessman who founded Uwajimaya in 1928.

== Biography ==
Moriguchi was born to a family of mikan growers in Yawatahama in 1898, the oldest of the children of Kenshichi Moriguchi and his wife Suwa. Upon graduating from middle school, he started working in neighboring Uwajima. After several years studying food processing in Uwajima, he emigrated to the United States in 1923.

Having settled in Tacoma, Washington, Moriguchi worked by farming and then at a restaurant before moving to Main Fish Company in Seattle where he met Shozo Tsutakawa, father of George Tsutakawa. He soon left Main Fish to found Uwajimaya, which he named for Uwajima, in Tacoma. At first, he sold homemade fishcakes and various cuisines regarding seafood to several Japanese Americans from the back of his truck.

Moriguchi's efforts caught the attention of Tsutakawa, who saw Moriguchi as a match for his daughter Sadako. According to family tradition, it was Tsutakawa who arranged the marriage between his daughter and Moriguchi. After being in a relationship for two years, they married in 1932.

In 1942, after the attack on Pearl Harbor and signing of Executive Order 9066, the Moriguchis were moved to Pinedale, California, where their daughter was born, and then to Tule Lake, where the other two children were born. After the war, the family moved to Seattle. There, Moriguchi, with the money he borrowed from friends and former customers of Uwajimaya, bought a small building on South Main Street in Seattle's Japantown where he re-established his business in 1946. In 1962, Uwajimaya made exhibitions by opening their own gift shop at the Century 21 Exposition. That same year in August, Moriguchi died at the age of 64, leaving his business to his four sons, Kenzo, Tomio, Akira, and Toshikatsu.
