= Pinedale, California =

Pinedale
- District of Fresno, California; Former Unincorporated community
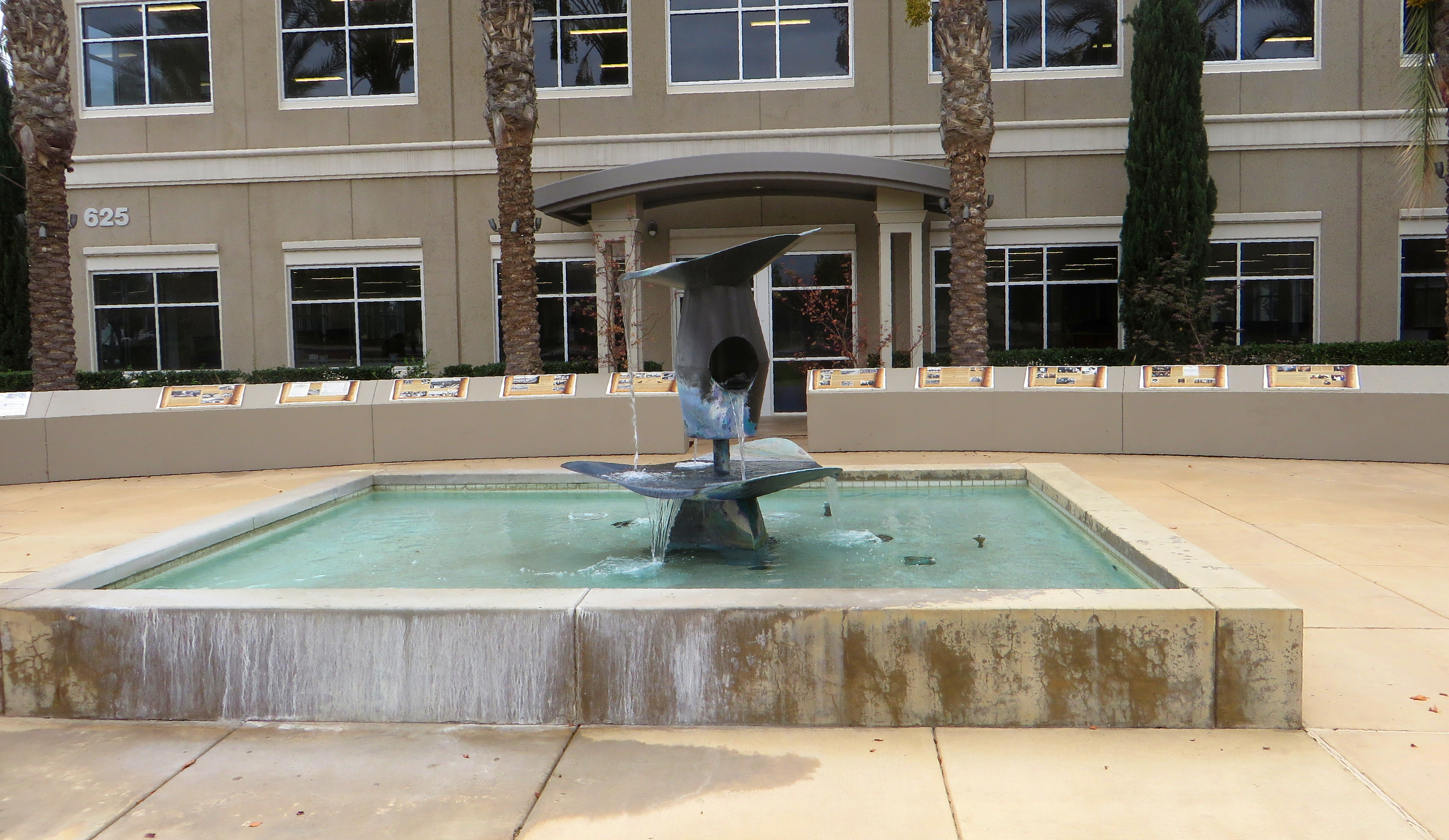

- Location in California Pinedale (the United States)
- Coordinates: 36°50′34″N 119°47′24″W
- Country: United States
- State: California
- County: Fresno County
- City: Fresno
- Elevation: 348 ft (106 m)

Pinedale is a community within the city of Fresno, California. Once a rural unincorporated community located on the Southern Pacific Railroad 3.5 miles (5.6 km) north-northwest of Clovis, Pinedale has since become surrounded and annexed by the city of Fresno. It lies at an elevation of 348 feet (106 m). Millerton Lake State Recreational Area is to its Northeast. Pinedale's ZIP Code is 93650, and the community is inside area code 559.

The first post office in Pinedale opened in 1923.

== Pinedale Assembly Center ==
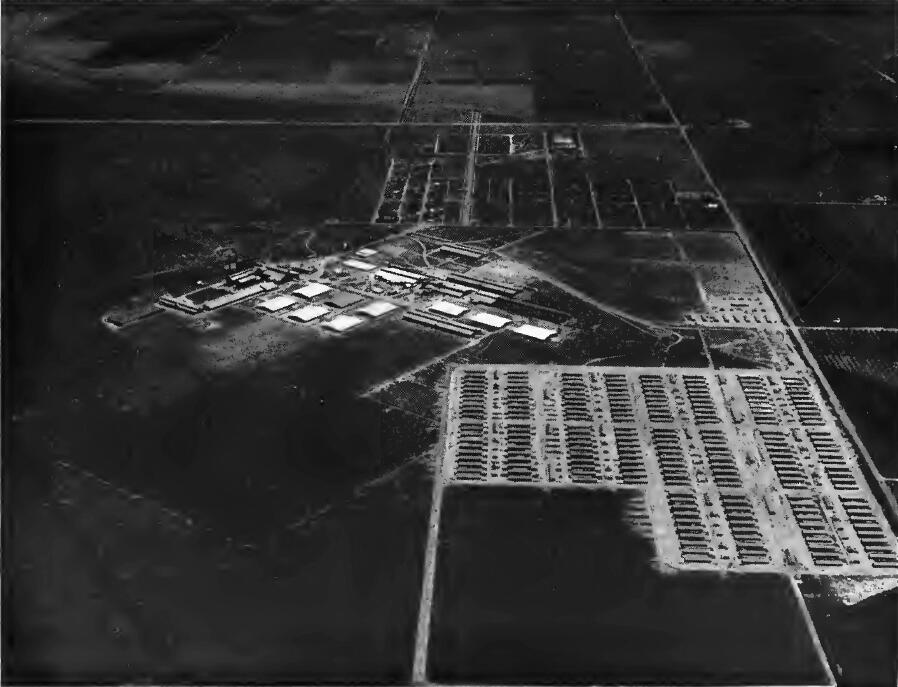
Camp Pinedale in 1942

The community was the site of one of several temporary detention camps (also known as 'assembly centers') located throughout the West that represented the first phase of the mass incarceration of 97,785 Californians of Japanese ancestry during World War II. Pursuant to Executive Order 9066 signed by President Franklin D. Roosevelt on February 19, 1942, thirteen makeshift detention facilities were constructed at various California racetracks, fairgrounds, and labor camps. These facilities were intended to confine Japanese Americans until more permanent internment camps, such as those at Manzanar and Tule Lake in California, could be built in isolated areas of the country. Beginning on March 30, 1942, all native-born Americans and long-time legal residents of Japanese ancestry living in California were ordered to surrender themselves for detention.

Known as "Camp Pinedale" the assembly center was located six miles (10 km) north of downtown Fresno on vacant land near an existing mill-workers housing area. The area is now within the Fresno city limits, north of Herndon Avenue and one mile (1.6 km) west of Blackstone Avenue.

The Army officially acquired the site on 24 March 1942. At the time of acquisition there were 21 warehouses and 11 other buildings which had been used to store cotton, sugar, and machinery. From 7 May to 23 July 1942, the Pinedale Assembly Center housed a total of 4,823 evacuees, with a maximum of 4,792 at a time. The evacuees were from Sacramento and El Dorado counties, and Oregon and Washington. Ten barracks blocks, each with 26 buildings, were constructed for the evacuees, and a separate block was built for the military police and administration. Also at the camp was the 840th Army Air Forces Specialized Depot.

There is an historical marker just east of Blackstone Avenue on the site of the railroad stop where the Japanese were brought to Fresno. The tracks have been removed, and there is now a bike trail in their place. The granite marker is on the side of the trail below the Freeway 41 overpass on Nees Avenue. At present, some of the original buildings from that era are still standing and a memorial is planned to be unveiled.

== Education ==
Fresno County Public Library operates the Pinedale Branch Library.

Clovis Unified School District serves the Pinedale Community. CUSD's Pinedale Elementary School, Nelson Elementary School, Kastner Intermediate School and Clovis West High School operate in the Pinedale area.

== See also ==
- Japanese American internment
