= Uwajimaya =

Supermarket chain in Washington and Oregon

- Logo since 2020

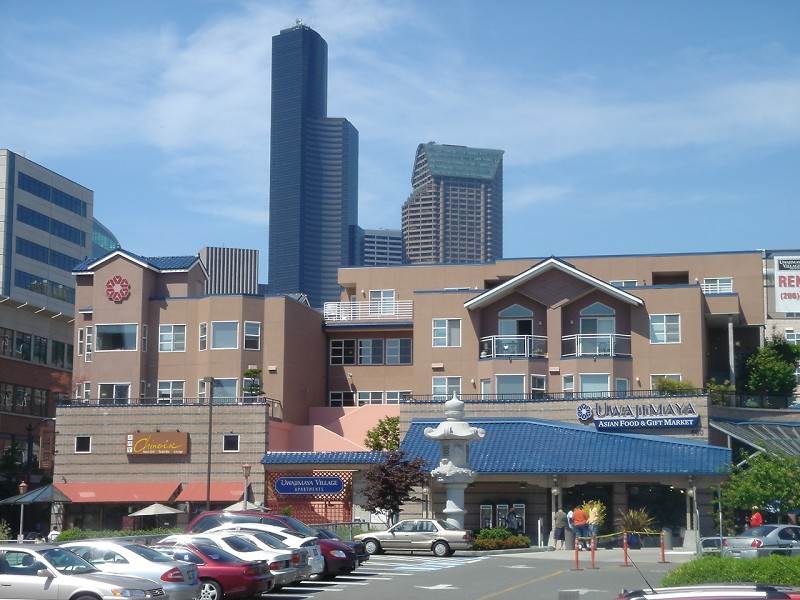
- Uwajimaya Village in Seattle's International District
- Type: Asian supermarket
- Industry: Retail, Food court
- Founded: 1928; 98 years ago in Tacoma, Washington
- Headquarters: Seattle, Washington
- Number of locations: 5
- Area served: Washington, Oregon
- Products: Japanese cuisine, Asian cuisine
- Website: http://www.uwajimaya.com/

Uwajimaya, Inc., doing business as Uwajimaya Asian Grocery & Gift Markets (宇和島屋, Uwajimaya), is a family-owned supermarket chain with its corporate headquarters in the International District, Seattle, Washington, and with locations in Greater Seattle and Oregon. Uwajimaya sells mainly Asian food—with an emphasis on Japanese—though it also stocks Western staples. The flagship store is in Seattle's Chinatown/International District with three other stores in Beaverton, Oregon; Bellevue, Washington; and Renton, Washington. From 1968 to 1991 there was another store in the Southcenter Mall in Tukwila, Washington.

== History ==
Uwajimaya was founded in 1928 by Fujimatsu Moriguchi of Yawatahama, Japan, in Tacoma, Washington. Fujimatsu sold fishcakes and other goods from his truck to Japanese farmers, loggers and fishermen at work sites. Moriguchi named his company Uwajima-ya after the town of Uwajima (Ehime Prefecture), where he first entered the business (ya (屋) is the Japanese word for "store").

As part of the internment of Japanese Americans following the entry of the United States into World War II, The US Government sent Moriguchi and his family to the Tule Lake Internment Camp in 1942. Upon their release, they moved to Seattle and set up shop at 422 S. Main Street in the International District.

In the 1960s, Uwajimaya began to expand its offering of non-food items and imported food from Japan and other Asian countries and experienced tremendous growth at the Century 21 Exposition in 1962. That same year, Fujimatsu Moriguchi died, and breaking with Japanese tradition, control of the company was passed to his four sons, rather than only his eldest son. The sons subsequently divided ownership with their three sisters and their mother Sadako.

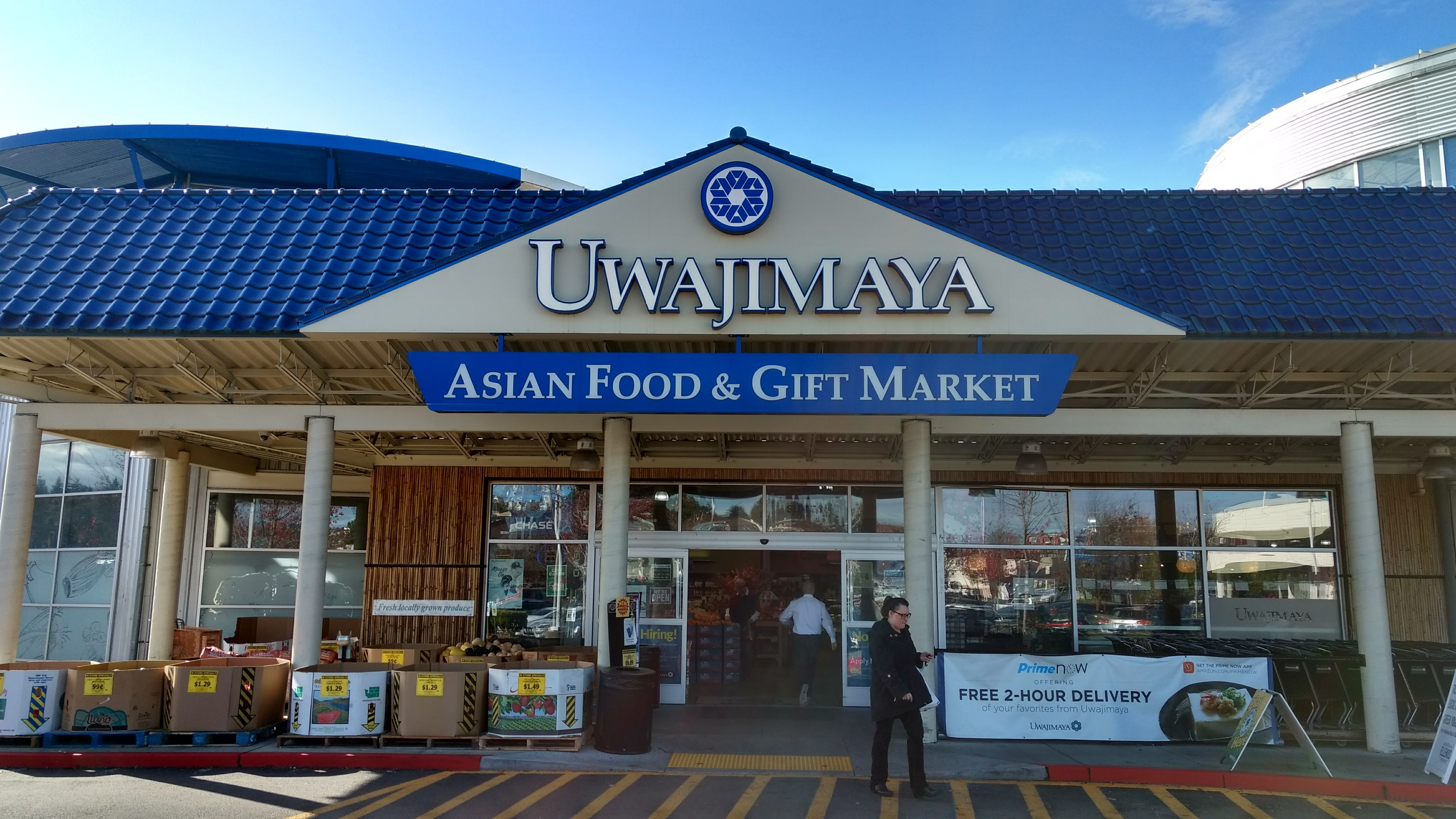
Uwajimaya storefront in Bellevue, Washington

A second store, at Southcenter Mall in Tukwila, Washington, opened in 1968 and included a small garden and fountain at its entrance. In 1970, the International District store moved two blocks south to 6th Avenue S. and S. King Street, thus becoming one of the biggest in the Pacific Northwest. It had grown to cover six storefronts along South King Street and was further expanded in 1978 adding more than half again its original size. A location in Bellevue, Washington, opened in June 1978 as Uwajimaya looked to target more non-Japanese customers through cooking classes and other events. The company also sought to expand further into the Seattle suburbs, including locations in Federal Way and Lynnwood.

In 1991, Tokyo-based Kinokuniya Bookstore opened its first Seattle location on the second floor of the Seattle store selling primarily Japanese language books, movies, DVD, videos, music, and periodicals.

In 1998, Uwajimaya, with Lorig Associates, started developing Uwajimaya Village, a mixed retail, residential center that would take up three city blocks including the purchase and closure of S. Lane Street between 5th and 6th Avenues South. The Lane Street closure was controversial within the community, especially among some local small-business owners who were concerned that it would increase traffic, decrease emergency vehicle access, and have a negative economic impact on other businesses. The International District saw a protest of over 500 strong, the biggest street protests since the Kingdome was built. Save Lane Street, a group formed to stop the street closure, collected over $140,000 and 4,000 signatures and sued both the city of Seattle and Uwajimaya. The group lost their case, eventually appealing to the King County Superior Court and then the state Court of Appeals. In the end S. Lane Street was vacated to allow Uwajimaya to provide a pedestrian walkway to customer parking to the south.

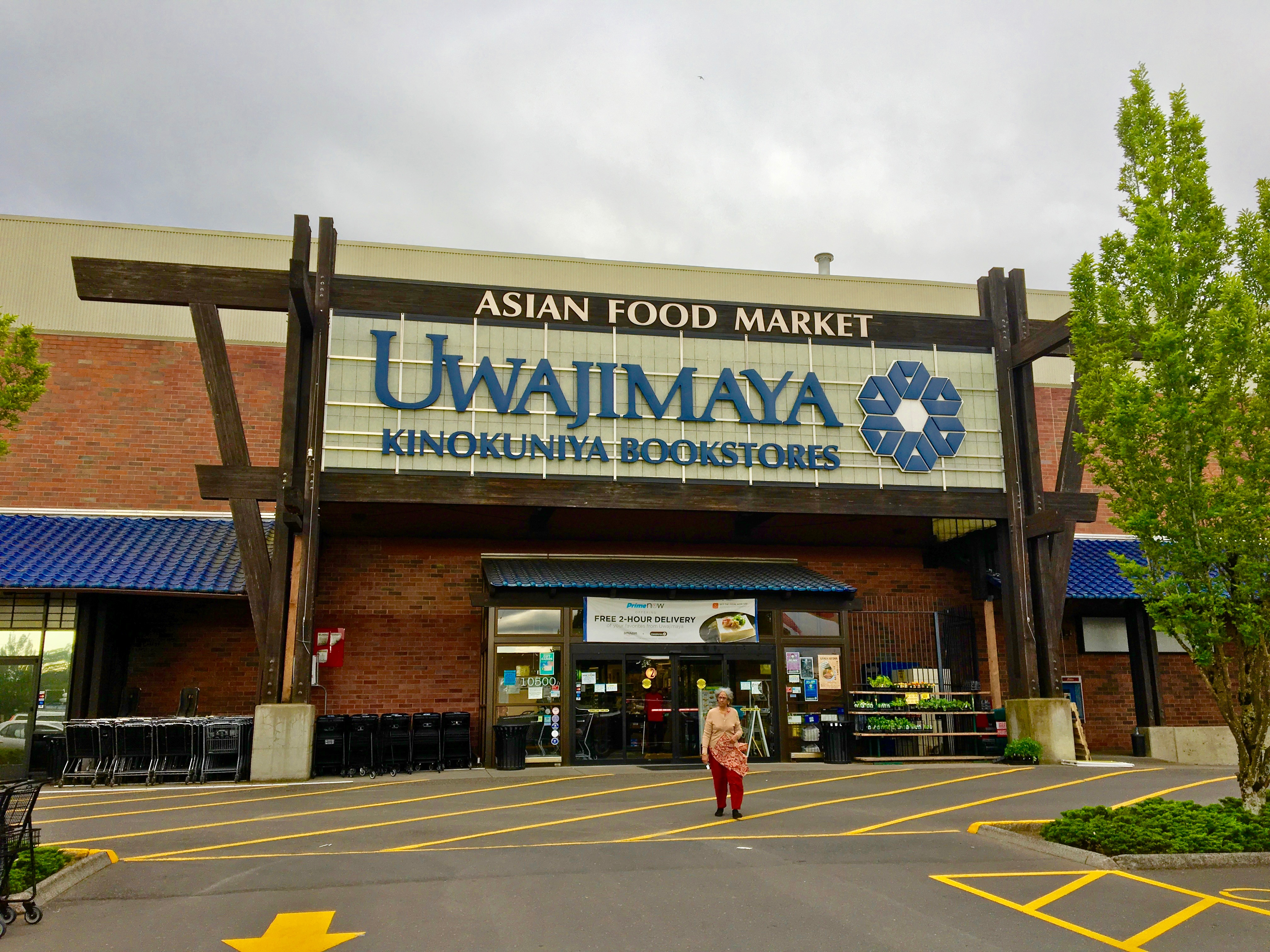
Beaverton, Oregon Uwajimaya

In 1998, Uwajimaya opened its third store, the first outside Washington located in Oregon near the Beaverton high-tech corridor. This location was formerly a Jafco store, another retail chain founded in Seattle.

Upon completion of the Uwajimaya Village project in 2000, the flagship store moved one block south to a building nearly twice the size of the previous store at 60,000 square feet (5,600 m^{2}). Uwajimaya Village includes a food court, bank, restaurant, optician, beauty salon, cellular wireless store, and cosmetic shop. The Kinokuniya Bookstore also relocated to a new location at the corner of 5th Avenue S. and S. Weller Street. Above the first floor of retail shops and underground parking garage is the 176-unit Uwajimaya Village Apartments. Uwajimaya completed a renovation of its flagship store in November 2020 to add a grab-and-go section and rearrange other areas.

Sadako (Tsutakawa) Moriguchi, wife of Fujimatsu and sister of George Tsutakawa, died in 2002. She had worked in the store from its inception until she reached the age of 85.

Uwajimaya opened another location in Renton, Washington on July 1, 2009. A fifth location, in Issaquah, Washington, was announced in 2025 after the company acquired the lease of a former Rite Aid. In early 2026, a sixth location was announced to open in Tacoma, Washington, and is slated for a 2027 opening alongside the Issaquah branch.

In August 2016, Uwajimaya announced its intention to launch a line of smaller, boutique stores known as "Kai Market by Uwajimaya". Kai Market opened in Seattle's South Lake Union neighborhood in 2017, but closed in 2020 due to impacts from the COVID-19 pandemic.

Store interiors
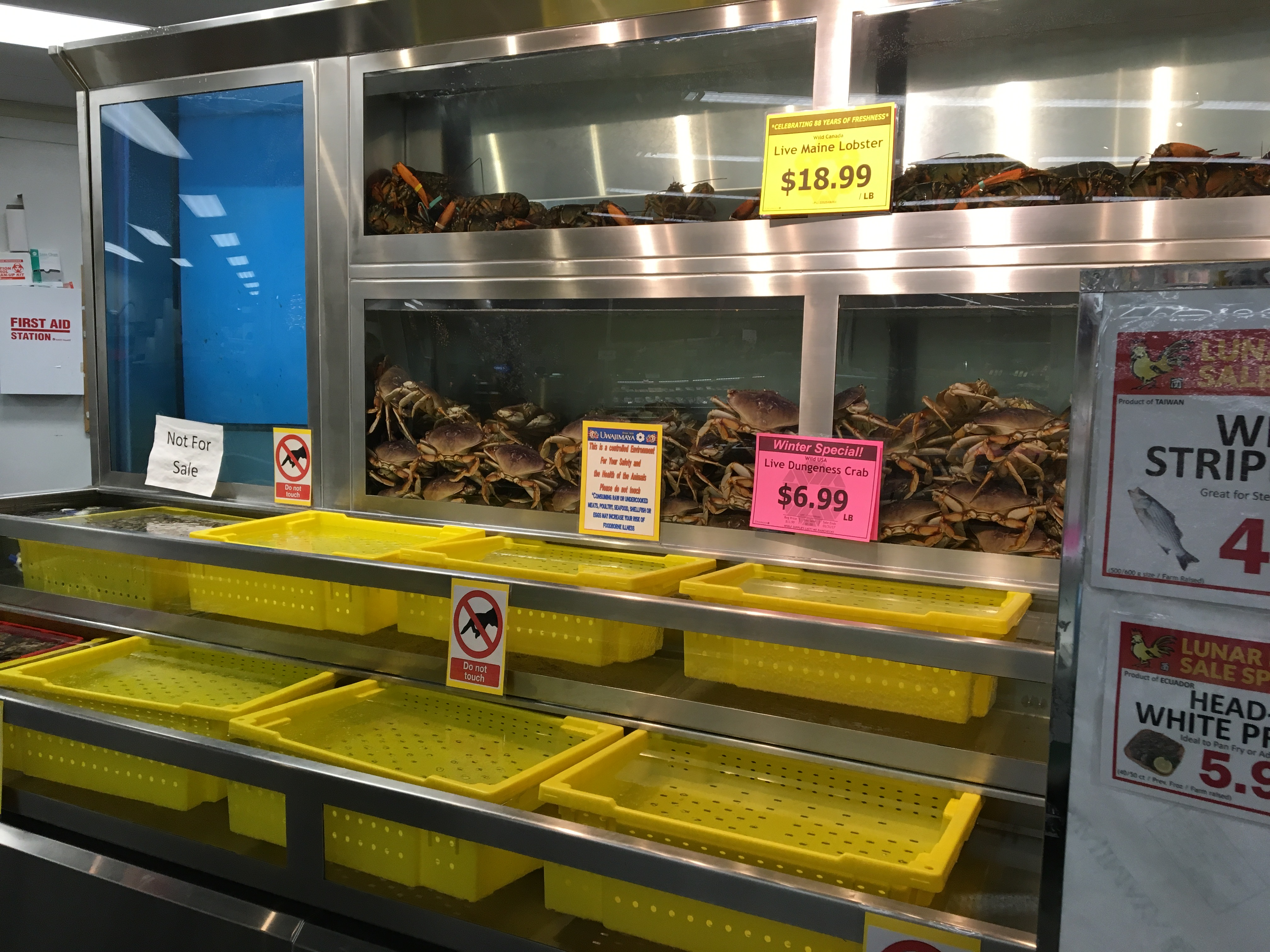
Live seafood at Uwajimaya in Beaverton, Oregon

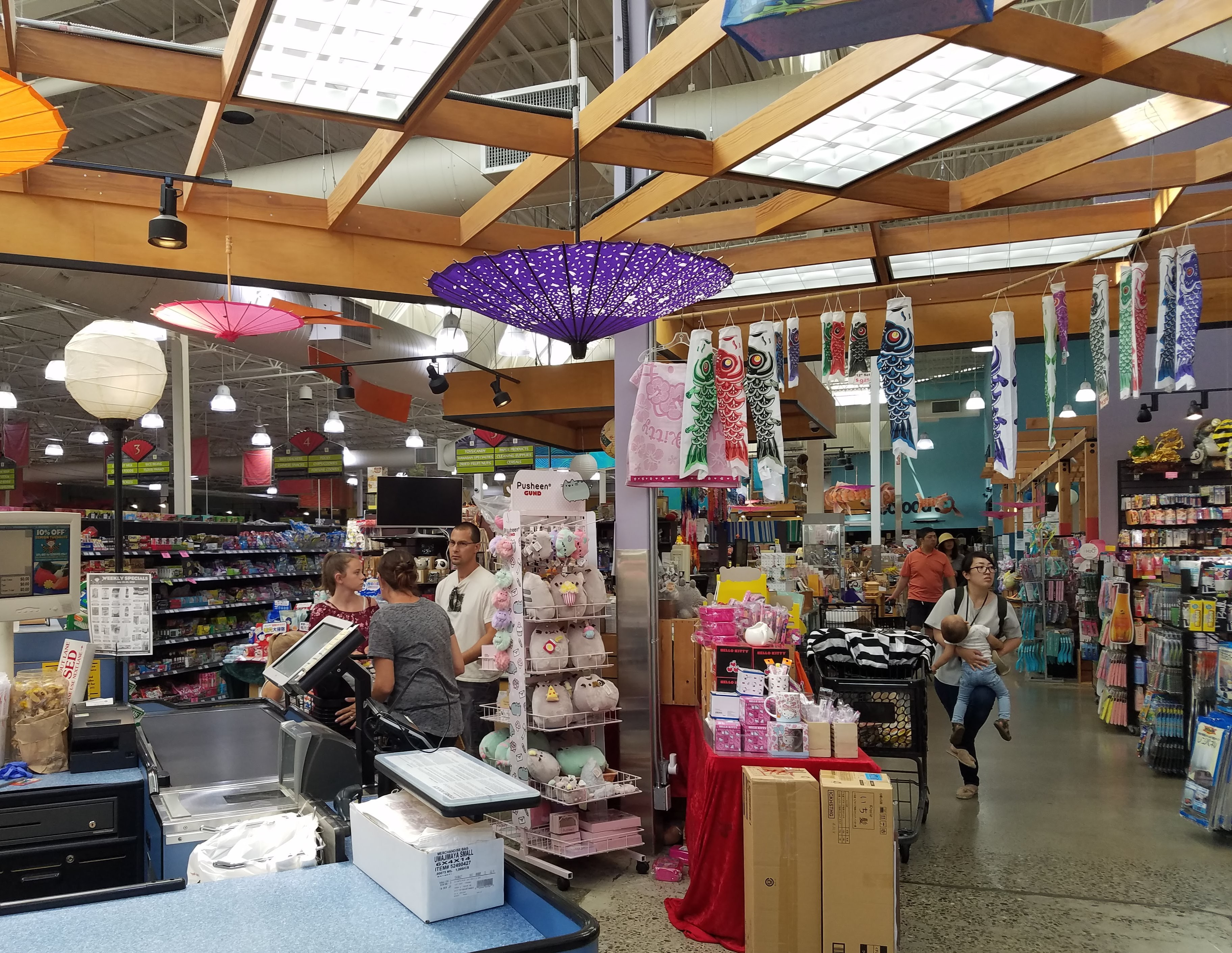
Interior of the Bellevue Uwajimaya in 2018

== See also ==
- History of the Japanese in Seattle
- Tomio Moriguchi
- Tomoko Moriguchi-Matsuno
- Denise Moriguchi
