= Buddy Foley =

American artist, musician, and video documentarist

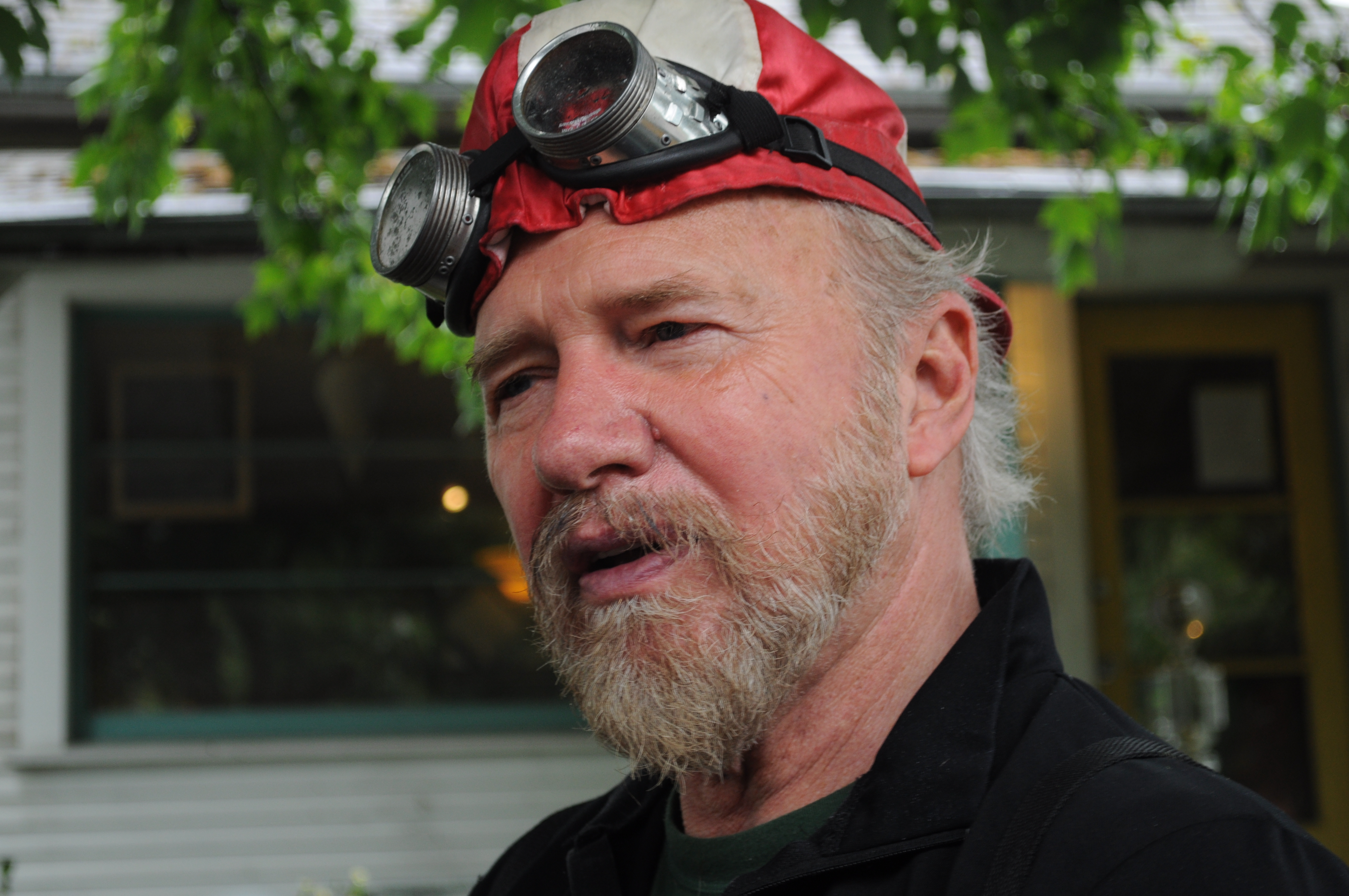
Hubert Tibbles Foley, 2011

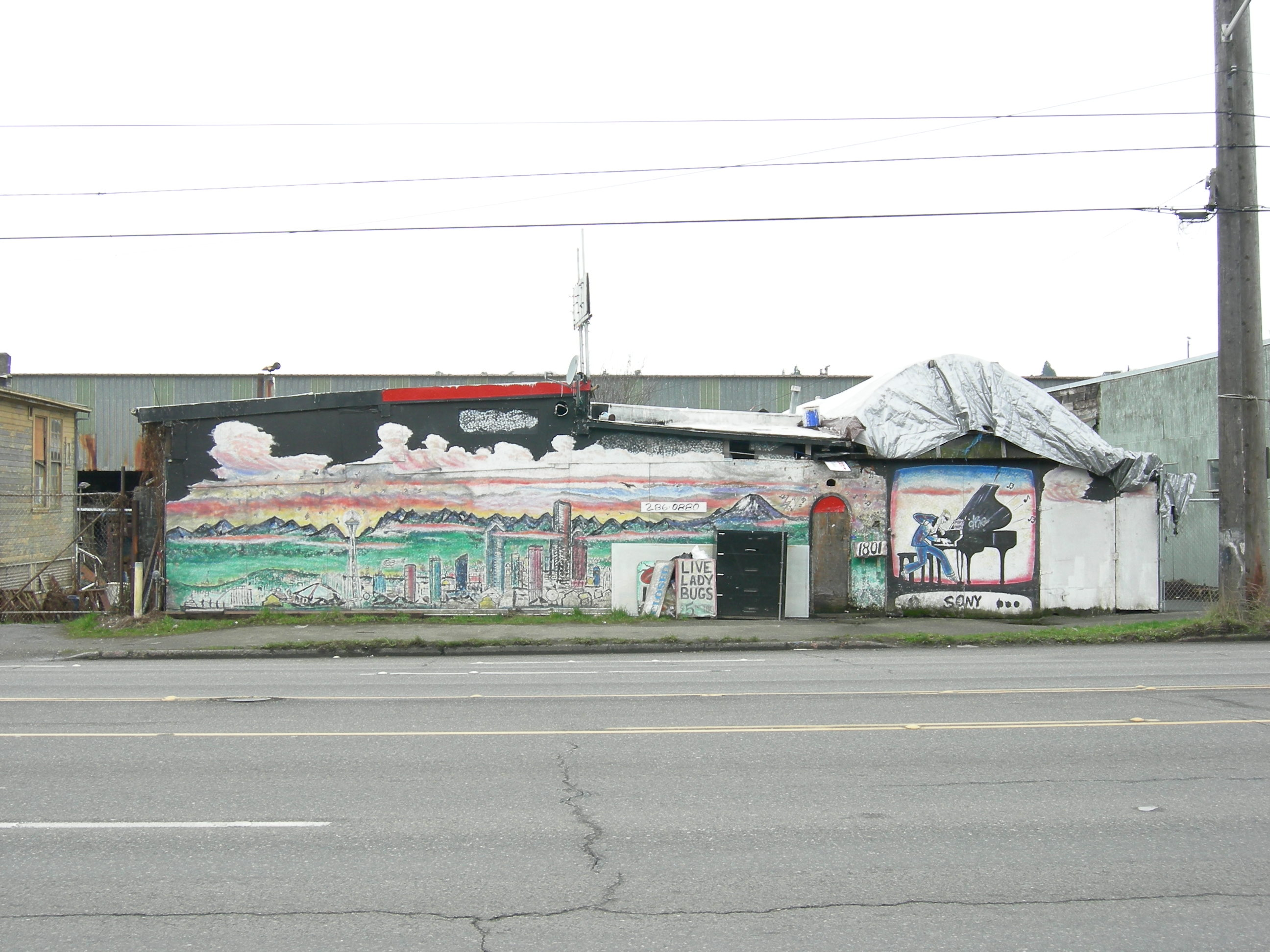
Foley's home and studio on 15th Avenue West (photographed 2007, demolished later that year)

Hubert Tibbles "Buddy" Foley (born 1945) is an American artist, musician, and video documentarist. He lives in Seattle.

Born in Vancouver, Washington, he graduated with a degree in psychology from the University of Washington and also studied jazz at Cornish College of the Arts.

In 2003, Kristin Dizon wrote that Foley has been "always on the cusp of fame and recognition." He played piano at numerous Seafair balls and at a 2007 reception for Hillary Clinton at Seattle's Benaroya Hall. His neon art, including a 1987 show taking up all of the showcase windows of the Downtown Seattle flagship store of The Bon Marché briefly earned him the nickname of Seattle's "neon king". For 20 years he lived in a converted gas station on 15th Avenue West, slightly north of the Magnolia Bridge in Seattle's Interbay neighborhood, where he became known for selling ladybugs. After a reprieve from eviction in 2005, he was evicted in 2007 when the building was razed.
