= Smith Cove (Seattle) =

Cove of Elliott Bay, Seattle, Washington, U.S.

Coordinates: 47°37′48″N 122°23′09″W

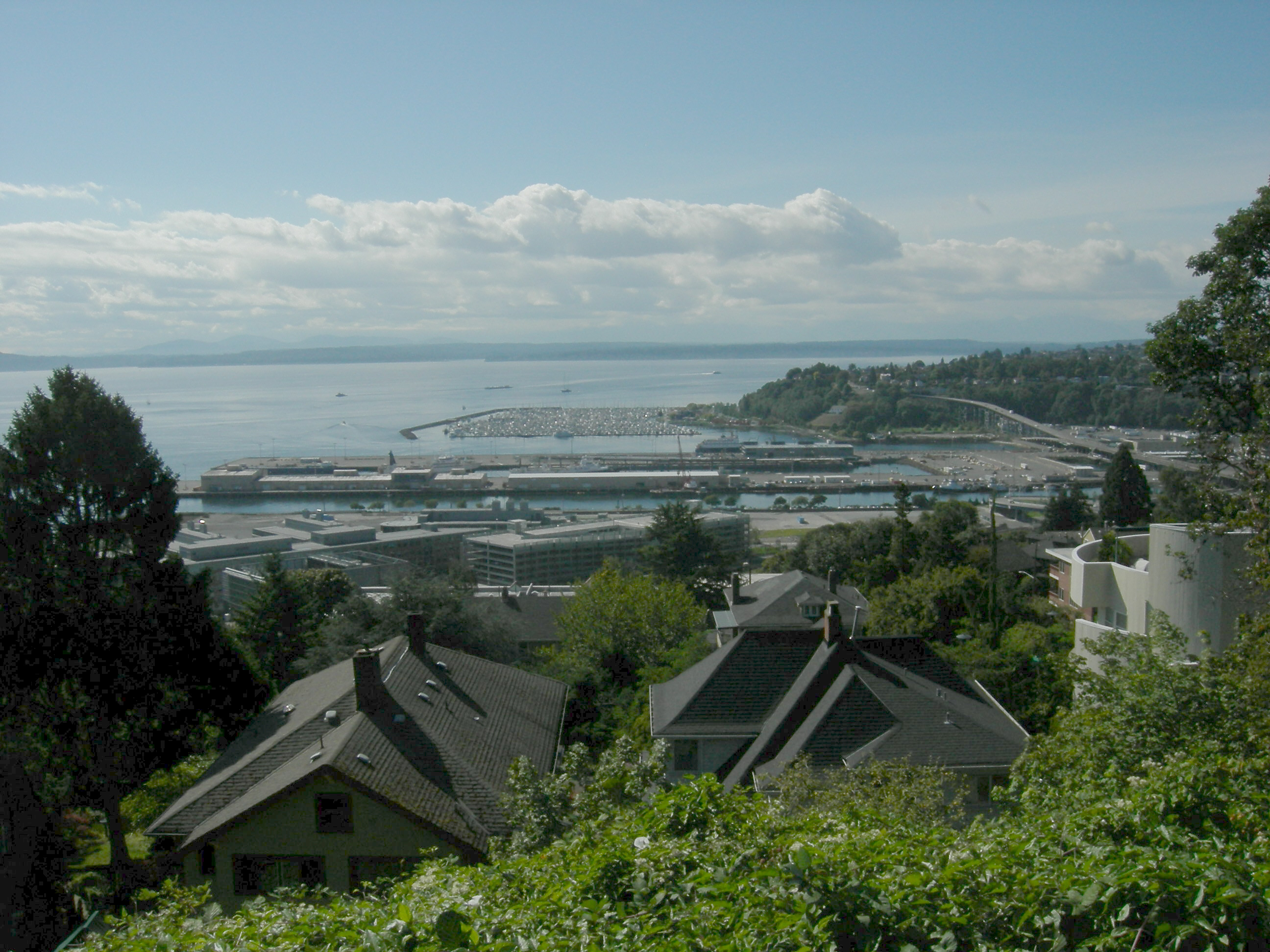
Smith Cove, with Elliott Bay Marina in the distance and Port of Seattle piers in front of that. Seen from the Betty Bowen Viewpoint on Queen Anne Hill. The Magnolia Bridge is at right.

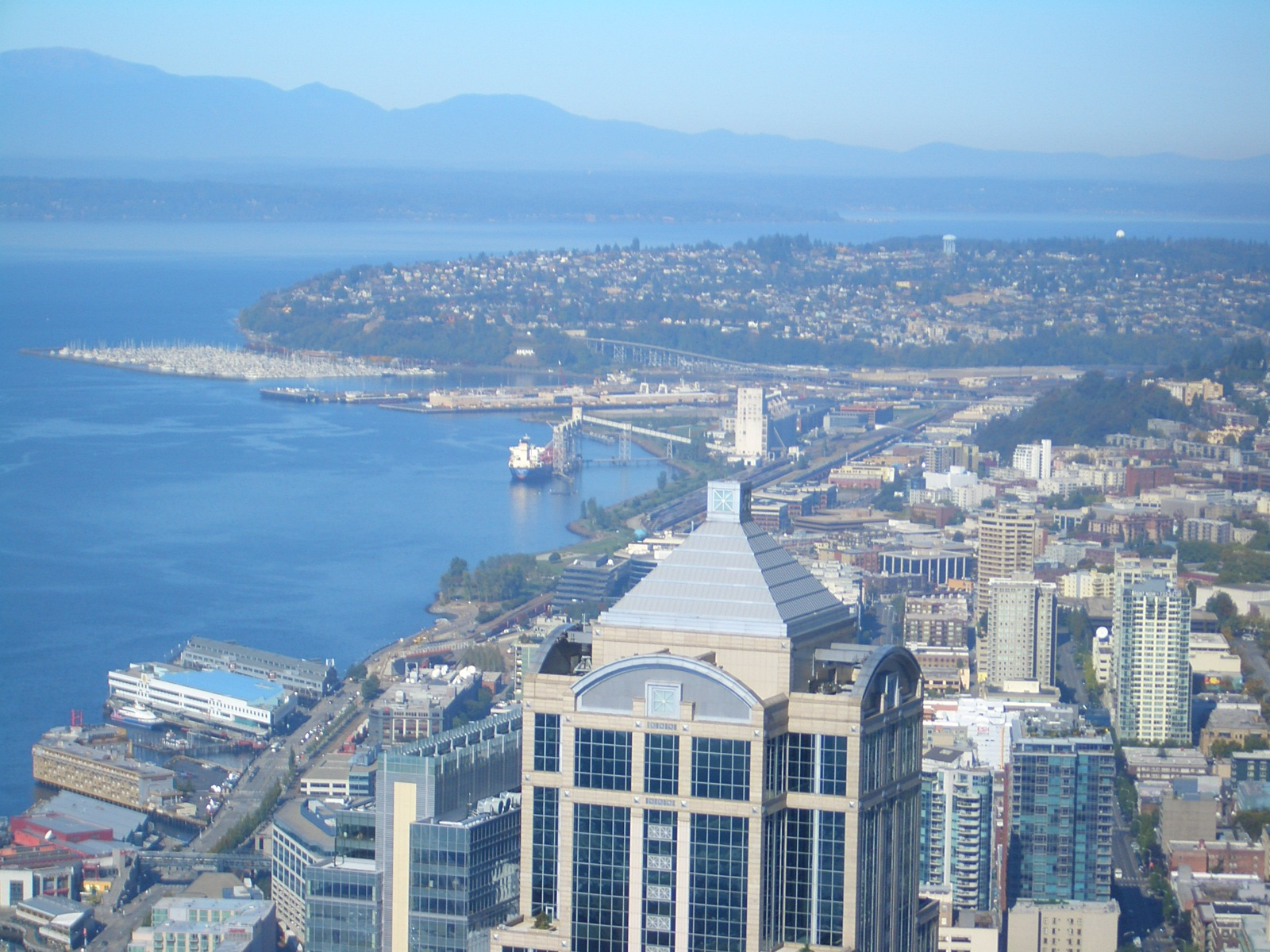
Smith Cove, seen from the Columbia Center downtown. This image also shows the grain terminal at the southwest corner of the cove.

Smith Cove (formerly known as "Smith's Cove") is a body of water, the northern part of Seattle, Washington's Elliott Bay, immediately south of the area that has been known since 1894 as Interbay. More precisely, it is the part of the bay that lies north of a line running southeasterly from the west end of Elliott Bay Marina in the northwest to the far northwest tip of Myrtle Edwards Park in the southeast.

It is home to the Port of Seattle's Piers 90 and 91, in addition to the marina.

The cove was named after Dr. Henry A. Smith of Wooster, Ohio, who, in 1853, was one of the first whites to settle in what is now Seattle. It was briefly a candidate to be the heart of the emerging city. The cove and its tide flats once stretched as far north as what is now the Interbay Athletic Field. James J. Hill bought 600 acres (2.4 km^{2}) of these tide flats in 1892 and had them filled in for the western terminal of the Great Northern Railway. At one time, the terminal included a switchyard, roundhouse, grain elevators, and warehouses as well as piers for oceangoing ships. Today, the rail yards of the BNSF Railway remain, as does the aforementioned athletic field. Other present-day features on landfill in what was formerly the cove are the Interbay Golf Center and the Washington Army National Guard Armory.

== History ==
=== Before 1900 ===
Although Smith Cove fell within the traditional geographic range of the Duwamish, early ethnographers did not record contact-era or earlier Native American villages in the immediate area of Smith Cove. Nonetheless, University of Washington ethnologist T. T. Waterman lists several native place names at or near Smith Cove. The mouth of one creek draining into the cove was called Silaqwotsid ("talking"). A creek just south of the bay (between Queen Anne Hill and the now-demolished Denny Hill was called T³E’kEp, after a type of aerial net used for snaring the ducks that flew from Lake Union toward Elliott Bay through the gap between the hills.

Early Euro-American settlers saw development potential around Smith Cove, farming on the flats and building houses on the nearby hillside. One of these was Ohio-born physician and poet Henry A. Smith (1830–1915), after whom Smith's Cove is now named. Smith and his wife, mother, and sister variously claimed or purchased much of what is now Interbay. Smith's original claim was on Salmon Bay near the present-day Ballard neighborhood, from which they acquired more land, moving south through what is now known as Interbay. In particular, the Smiths bought when so many other were selling during the 1855–56 Indian War (see Battle of Seattle (1856)). Smith established a settlement known as Boulevard roughly halfway between Smith Cove and Salmon Bay, near present-day West Dravus Street.

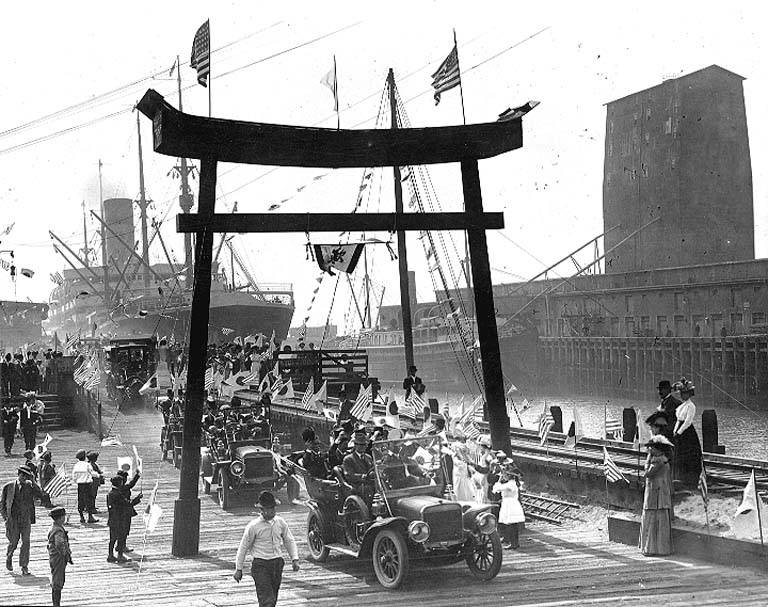
Japanese trade delegation arriving at Smith Cove in 1909

In 1884 the Seattle, Lake Shore and Eastern Railway (SLSER) bought all but 50 acres (20 ha) of the 9,600 acres (3,900 ha) the Smiths owned by that time. The SLSER served Boulevard, but did not build any major facilities at Smith Cove. That would be left to James J. Hill and his Great Northern Railway (one of the ancestors of today's BNSF). In 1892, the Great Northern purchased 600 acres (2.4 km^{2}) at Smith's Cove and built Piers 38 and 39. These were located to the east of present-day Piers 90 and 91, and constituted the western terminus of a transcontinental railway.

In 1896 the Nippon Yusen Kaisha used these piers as the North American terminus of the first regular steamship service between Asia and the Pacific Coast of North America. An important trade exporting lumber and importing silk and tea continued until the Maritime Strike of 1934 caused shipping lines, already beleaguered by the Great Depression, to shift operations to the Port of Los Angeles.

=== 1900–1933 ===
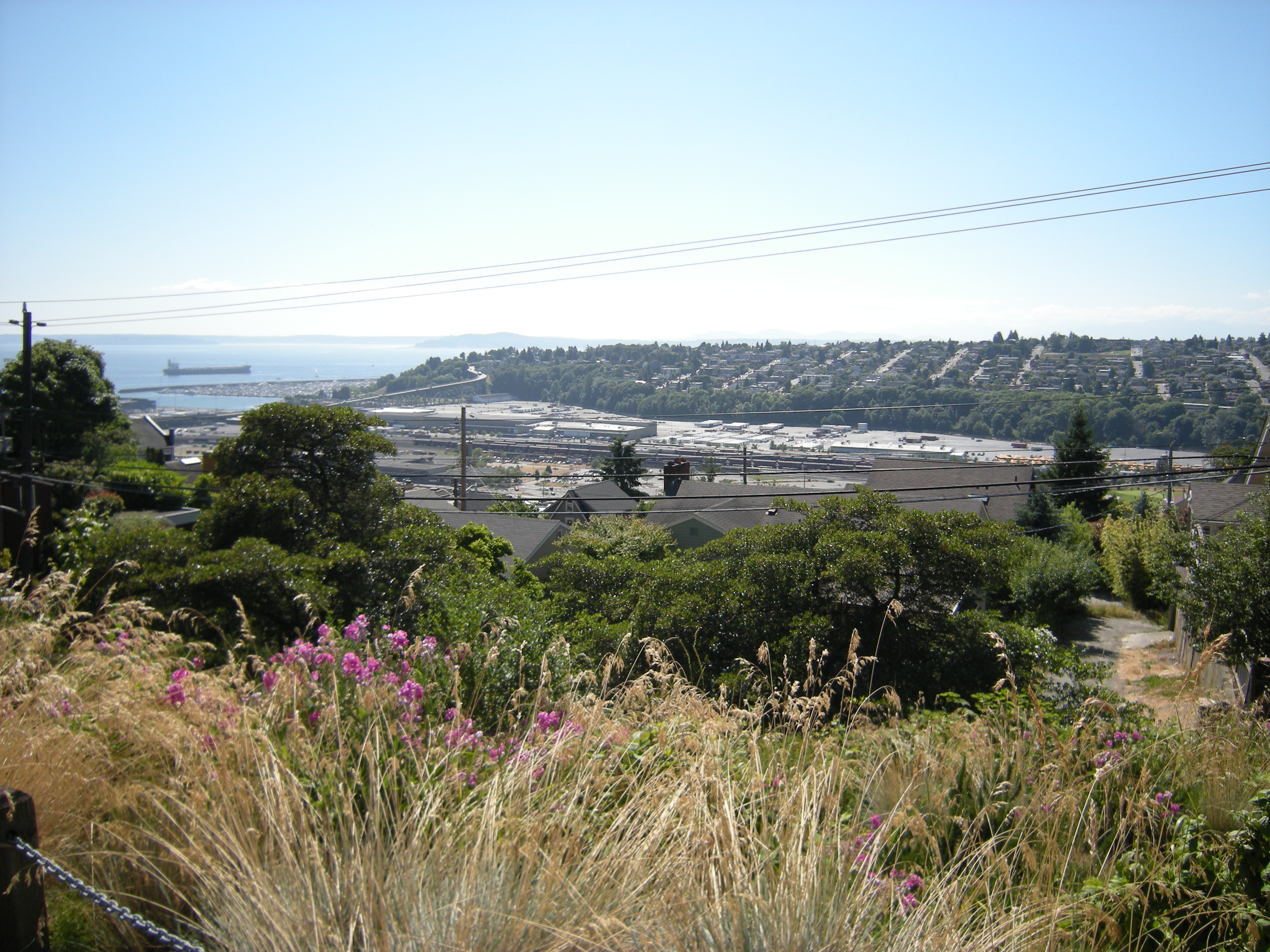
The former Smith Cove tideflats seen from Soundview Terrace on Queen Anne Hill. The hill in the background is part of Magnolia. The former tideflats lie between the two hills.

During the 1911–1916 construction of the Lake Washington Ship Canal along Salmon Bay, about 150 acres (61 ha) of Smith Cove tidelands were filled with material from the dredging. Some tidelands were also reclaimed as sanitary fill. The new Port of Seattle (formed 1911) built Fishermen's Terminal about 2 kilometres (1.2 mi) north on Salmon Bay and paid the Great Northern US$150,000 for the docks and approximately 20 acres (8.1 ha) of land at Smith's Cove. At Smith's Cove they developed two new coal and lumber piers, Pier 40 and 41 (renumbered in 1941 as Piers 90 and 91). Pier 41 was the largest pier on the Pacific Coast and believed to have been the world's largest concrete pier at the time. These developments at either end of Interbay led to the increasing industrialization of the area.

In this era, Queen Anne Hill and Magnolia were already connected by several trestles crossing Interbay and spanning the railway. In 1910 a bridge was proposed at West Garfield Street, spanning the Smith's Cove tidelands. By 1912 a wooden trestle had been built. The wooden trestle was replaced in 1930 by a concrete structure, improved in 1957 to provide a grade separation from Elliott Avenue West and, in 1960, renamed as the Magnolia Bridge.

=== The Maritime Strike of 1934 ===
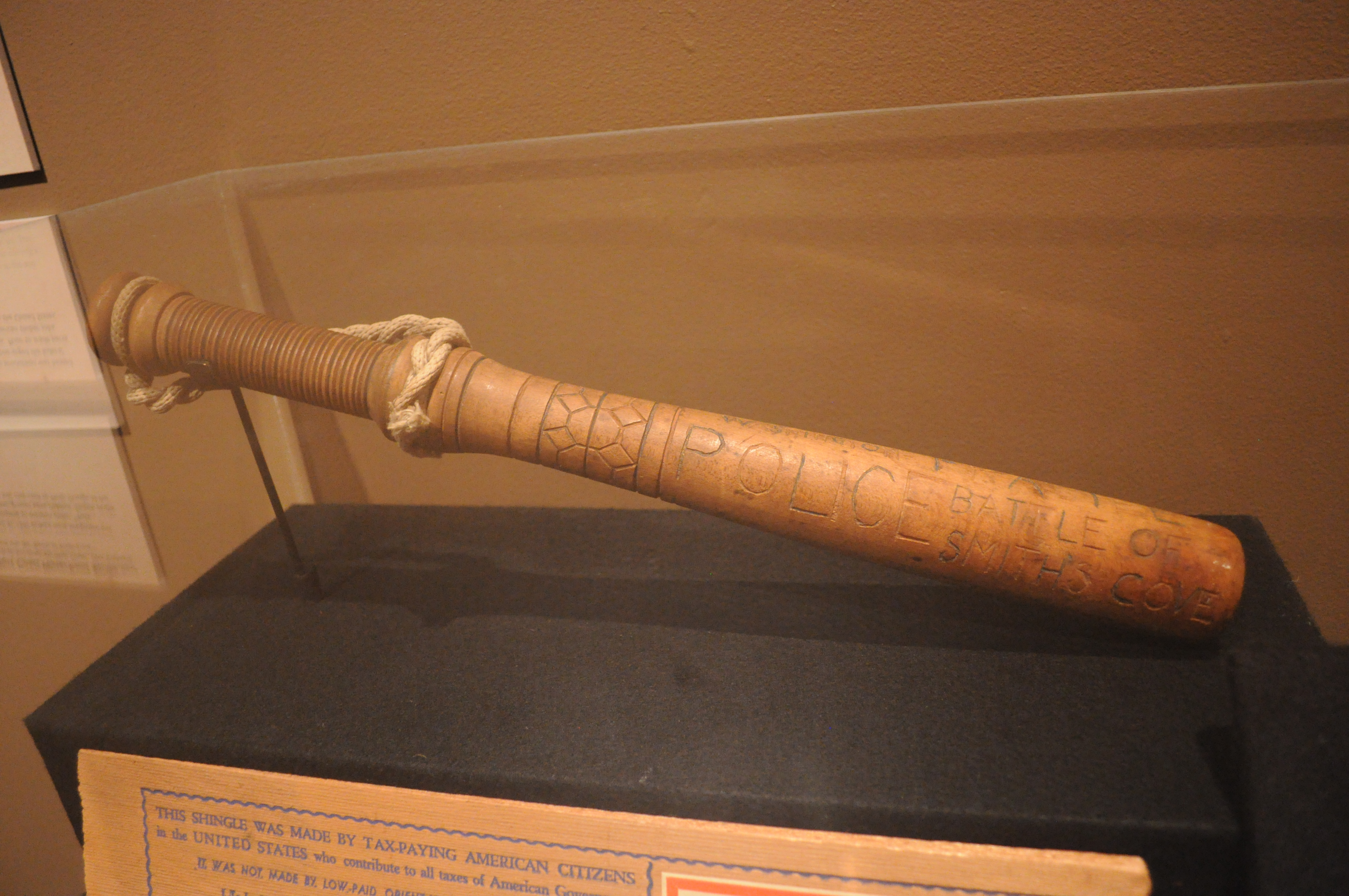
An engraved billy club commemorates police activity in the Battle of Smith Cove.

During the Maritime Strike of 1934, striking longshoremen faced off with police and strikebreakers in a series of daily skirmishes that became known as "The Battle of Smith Cove". With the support of the Teamsters, the strikers almost completely shut down rail and truck traffic in and out of the cove. Police beat longshoremen; longshoremen beat strikebreakers. There were several fatal bombings and shootings around the city, but Smith Cove was the focus of activity. On July 20, 1934 Mayor Charles L. Smith led the police in an attack on 2,000 longshoremen; the police used tear gas and clubs. On July 25 the strike was settled, but Seattle lost much of its maritime traffic to the Port of Los Angeles.

=== Naval Supply Depot ===
From 1939, the start of World War II in Europe fueled Puget Sound's shipbuilding industry; soon military activity also increased. The United States Navy attempted to take over the Smith Cove piers without compensation in March 1941, but ultimately paid the Port more than $3 million. Eventually the Navy bought another $17 million of surrounding land and developed the area north of the piers as a supply depot and a receiving station.

During and after the war these 253 acres (102 ha) of Smith Cove facilities (including 53 acres (21 ha) of covered storage) supported naval operations in the Pacific and Alaska. Warships, personnel transport vessels, and cargo vessels came and went. Facilities included 20 barracks for enlisted men, two barracks for WAVES, mess halls, recreation halls, an indoor swimming pool, a recreation field, a hospital, and a cafeteria for civilian workers.

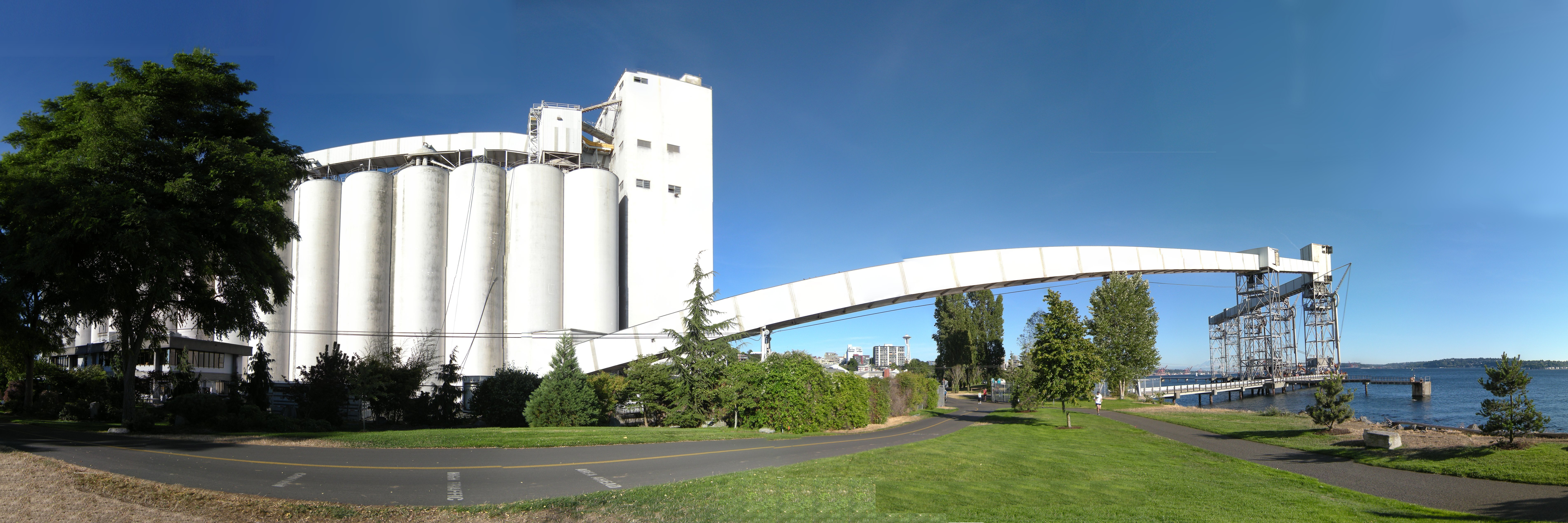
The grain terminal.

Although scaled back after World War II, the Naval Supply Depot continued to serve the Navy and other military service branches through the Korean War and into the Vietnam War. However, it was eventually superseded by a new Naval Supply Center across Puget Sound at Bremerton; the Navy announced closure of its Smith Cove facility in March 1970. The Port of Seattle immediately leased some facilities. They then worked out a deal for the Coast Guard to move its facilities for seagoing vessels in 1973 from Pier 91 to the Port's facilities at Piers 36 and 37, and in 1974 purchased 198 acres (0.80 km^{2}) of the Supply Depot property, including the piers, for $10.3 million.

The Navy retained some presence on the former Smith Cove tideflats until at least 1977, when a Naval correctional facility was still located there. Those functions were later moved to Sand Point Naval Support Activity, after a new brig was constructed there. The "Admiral's House" (a.k.a. "Quarters A") overlooking the site from Magnolia Bluff to the west, was sold in 2013. One military facility remains near the north end of the former tideflats: the Washington Army National Guard Armory is on the former site of a naval barracks, laundry, brig and mess hall. The National Guard leased the land beginning in 1973, and bought it in 1989.

=== Since the 1970s ===
Back under the control of the Port of Seattle, the Smith Cove facility served as a trans-shipment point for the construction of the Alaska Pipeline. Chempro took over the Navy's oil processing facilities at the cove. Once again, the Asian trade figured prominently. This time, the most prominent imports were Datsun (later Nissan) automobiles; Nissan retained a shipping and distribution center at Smith Cove from 1974 until 2001, part of which later was used as a service yard and maintenance facility for school buses. The most prominent exports were seafood delicacies. There are several cold storage facilities on the former tideflats serving the seafood trade, including CityIce, Trident Seafoods and Surefish Independent Inspection laboratories.

== The Fourteenth Avenue West Group ==
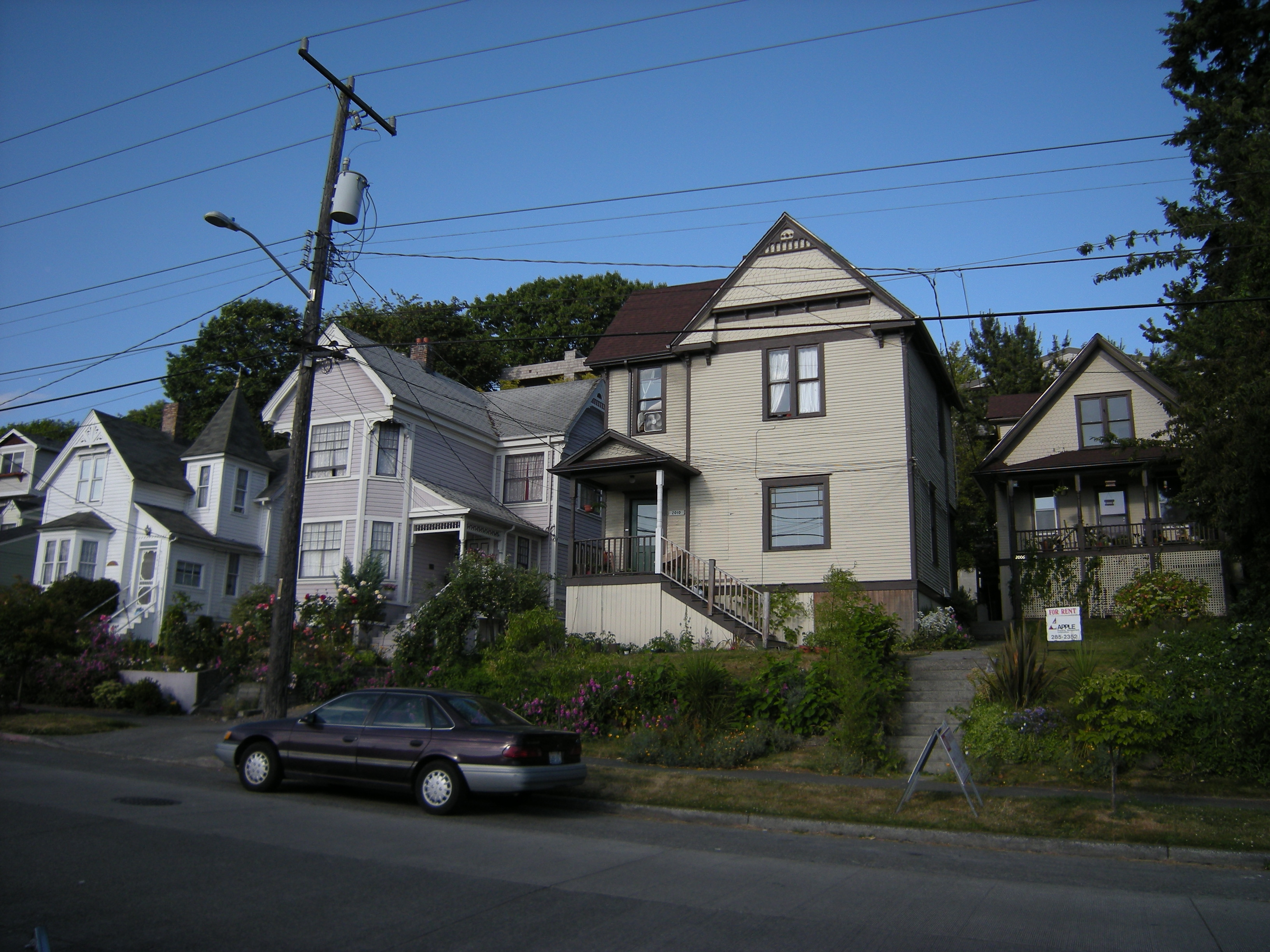
Four of the five houses in the Fourteenth Avenue West Group. The leftmost is the 1892 Gilman House, in Queen Anne style. The others were built as more modestly designed working-class homes.

The Fourteenth Avenue West Group, five late 19th-century houses now somewhat removed from the cove by landfill, originally were part of a Slavic and Finnish settlement along the cove. The houses were designated as city landmarks in 1979. The Finnish Brotherhood Hall (reused for various purposes) stood nearby for roughly a century on 15th Avenue West, but was eventually demolished.

The purchase of the Gilman house by Sharon Frances Young (later Southard) started the road to making the Fourteenth Avenue West Group a historical landmark. She and her husband, Robert Laurie Southard, owned the property from 1970 through 1980 and during that time, restored the Gilman house to its former glory, including replacing the fireplace mantel, and re-painting the exterior to a more traditional "firehouse" red with white trim. The house itself had modern amenities added as well, including a full cement basement and central heating. Prior to the Southards, the house relied solely on the one fireplace located in the front room for heating. The grounds surrounding the house included a raised yard with a monkey puzzle tree and camellia bush in the front, and a full lot in back used as a vegetable and fruit garden.
