= Kiwanis Ravine =

Park in Seattle, Washington

Coordinates: 47°39′43″N 122°24′01″W

- Interactive map of Kiwanis Ravine
- Type: Public park
- Operator: Seattle Parks Department

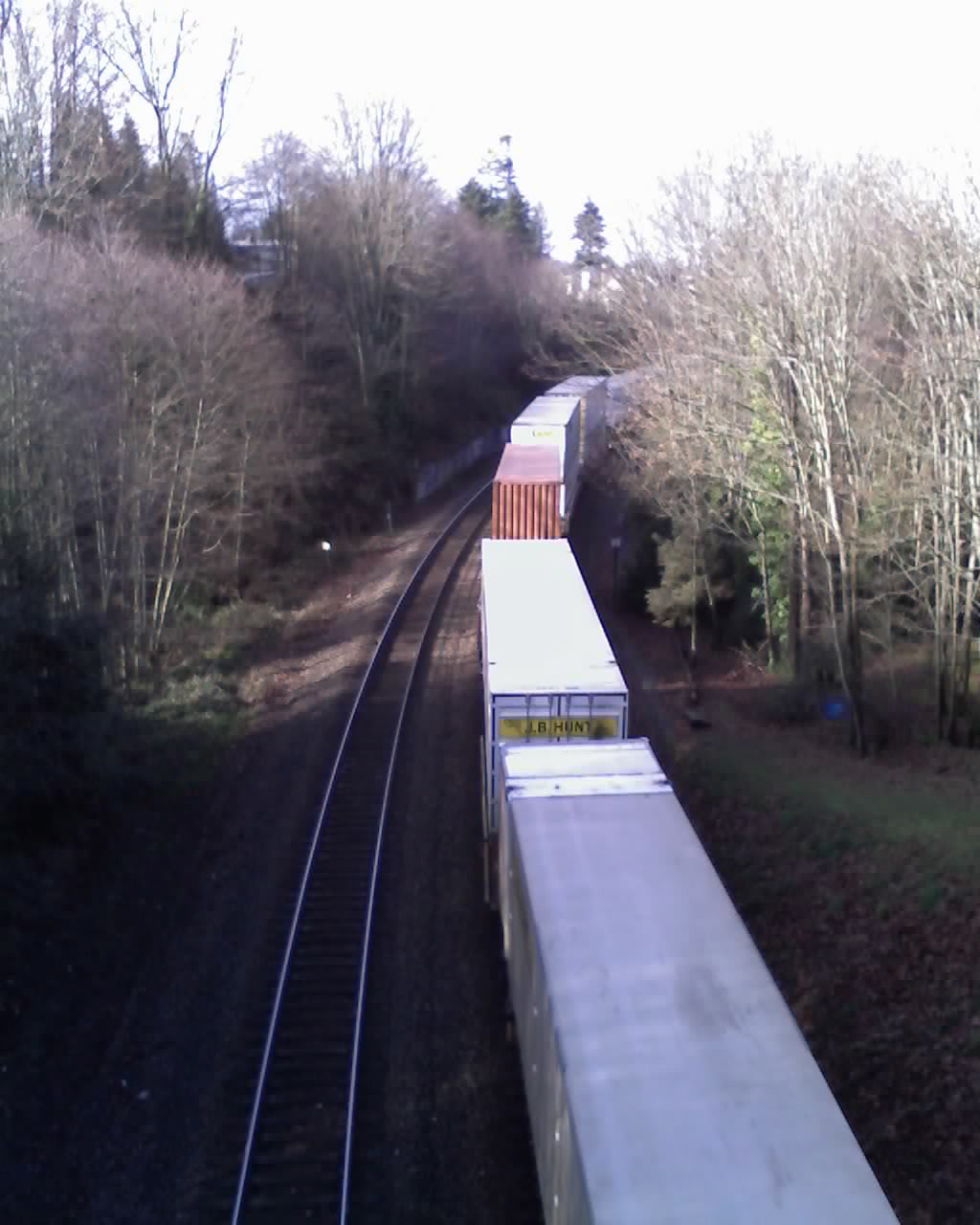
BNSF Railway tracks running just north of Kiwanis Ravine

Kiwanis Ravine is an 8.7-acre (3.5 ha) public park a block east of Discovery Park in the Magnolia neighborhood of Seattle, Washington.

== History ==
The park was purchased by the Kiwanis Club in the 1950s and donated to Seattle Parks Department.

In 2010, the park was named as the first wildlife sanctuary in Seattle. The park was formerly home to the largest nesting colony of great blue herons in the northwest. In 2013, the park's herons was moved to Commodore Park because of eagle predation. The park was expanded in 2017.
