= Salmon Bay Bridge =

Rail bridge in Seattle

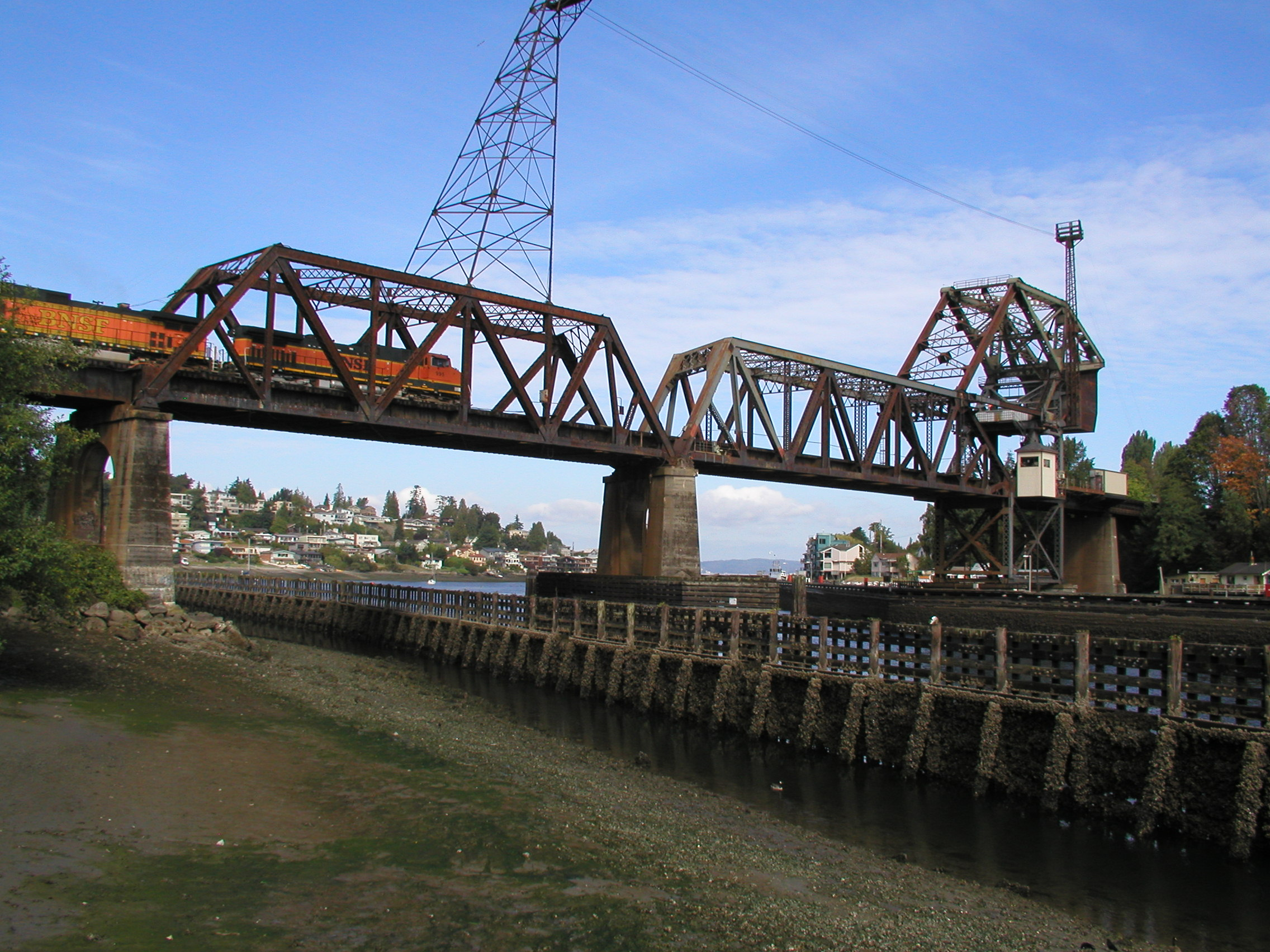
- Salmon Bay Bridge seen from the southeast
- Coordinates: 47.66680°N 122.40213°W
- Carries: BNSF Scenic Subdivision
- Crosses: Salmon Bay
- Other name(s): Bridge No. 4 (GN), Bridge 6.3 (BNSF)

Characteristics
- Design: Bascule
- Material: Steel
- Total length: 1,140 ft (350 m)
- Width: 26 ft (7.9 m)
- Clearance above: 43 ft (13 m)

Rail characteristics
- No. of tracks: 2

History
- Opened: 1914

Statistics
- Daily traffic: 30-40 trains per day

Location
- Interactive map of Salmon Bay Bridge

The Salmon Bay Bridge, also known as Bridge 6.3 on the BNSF railroad, formerly Bridge No. 4 on the Great Northern Railroad, is a Strauss Heel-trunnion single-leaf bascule bridge spanning Salmon Bay and connecting Magnolia/Interbay to Ballard in Seattle, Washington. The bridge is located just west of Commodore Park. It carries the main line of the BNSF Railway, the Scenic Subdivision, on its way north to Everett and south to King Street Station and Seattle's Industrial District.

The Salmon Bay Bridge, which is located west of the Hiram M. Chittenden Locks, is the last bridge to span the Lake Washington Ship Canal before it becomes Puget Sound. Built in 1914 by the Great Northern Railway, it has an opening span of 61 meters (200 feet) and has two tracks. Additionally, vessel clearance when lowered is 13.1 meters (43 feet) at mean high tide, and up to 15.3 meters (50 feet) at low tide.

BNSF Railway initially planned to replace the Salmon Bay Bridge with a new vertical-lift bridge, but chose to repair failing components of the existing bridge following consultation with the local community. In September 2022, the federal government issued a US$25 million dollar grant to fund mechanical upgrades, while BNSF contributed another $70 million toward the effort.

== Cultural impact ==
The Salmon Bay Bridge is featured on the crest of Salmon Bay FC, a semi-professional soccer team competing in USL W League.
