= Commodore Park =

Public park in Seattle, Washington, U.S.

- Heron nesting at Commodore Park
- Interactive map of Commodore Park
- Location: Seattle, Washington, U.S.
- Coordinates: 47°39′55″N 122°24′1″W

Commodore Park is a public park on the Magnolia side of the Ballard Locks, near the Salmon Bay Bridge, in Seattle, Washington.

The park has a heron habitat. In Noms magazine's list of the nine best parks in the city "to hang out with your loved ones", Commodore Park was deemed Seattle's best park with scenic canal views.

== See also ==
- List of parks in Seattle
