= Magnolia, Seattle =

Neighborhood in Seattle, Washington, United States

Magnolia
- Seattle Neighborhood
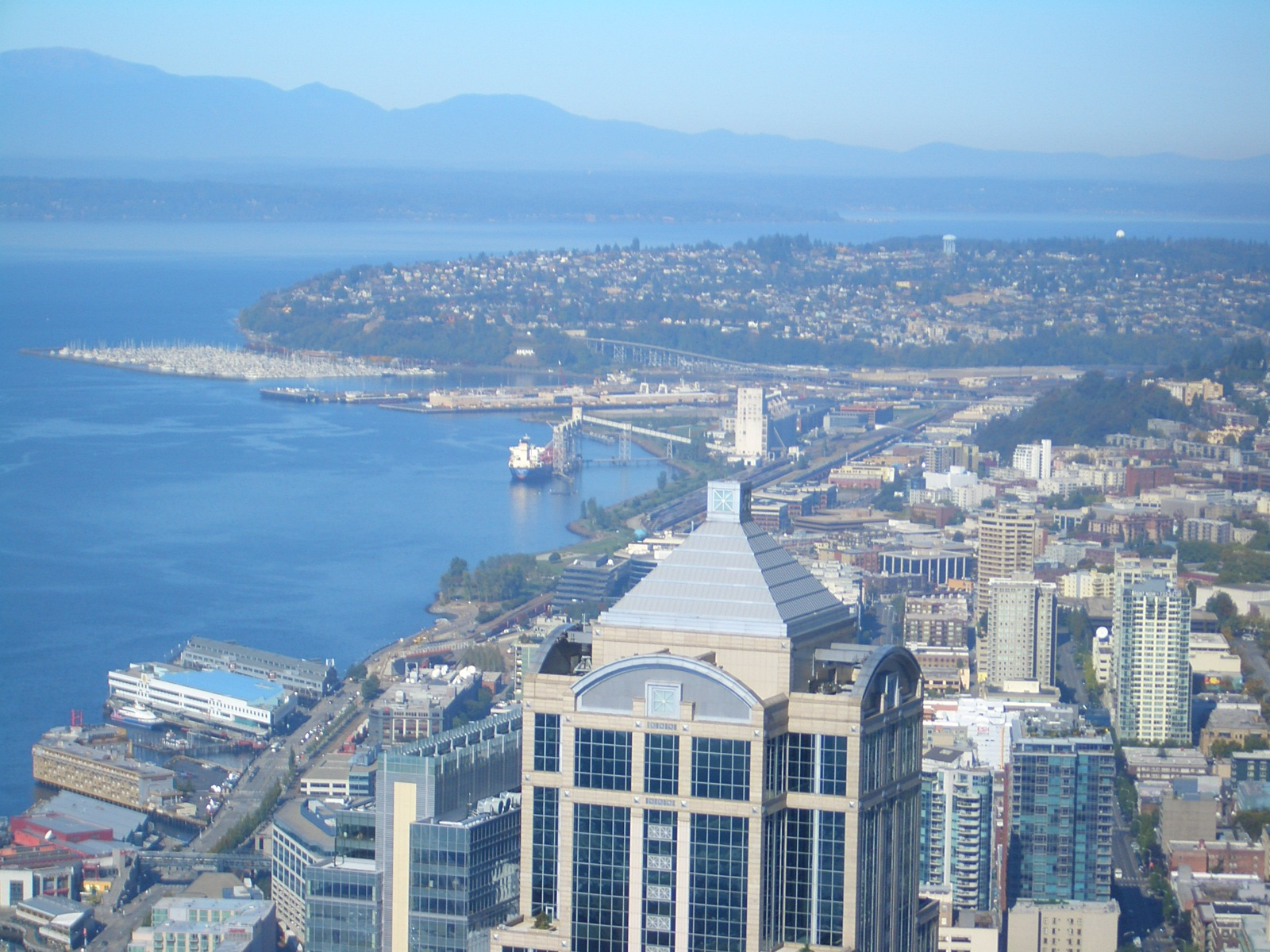
- Smith Cove and Magnolia seen from Columbia Center

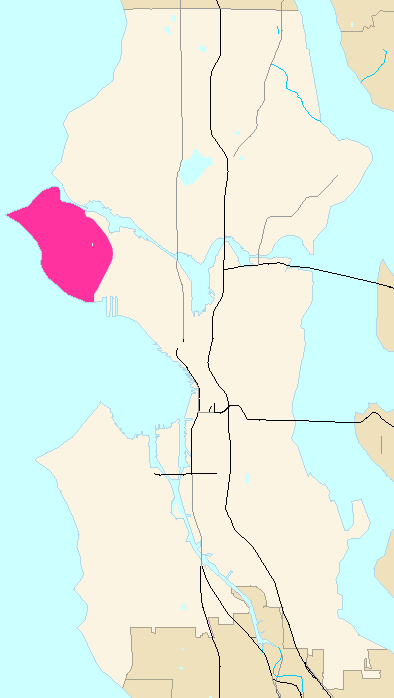
- Map of Magnolia's location in Seattle
- Coordinates: 47°39′02″N 122°24′03″W
- Country: United States
- State: Washington
- County: King
- City: Seattle
- City Council: District 6, 7
- ZIP Code: 98199
- Area code: 206, 564

Magnolia is the second largest neighborhood of Seattle, Washington, by area, located northwest of downtown. It occupies a hilly headland overlooking Puget Sound. Magnolia has been a part of the city since 1891. Much of the headland is taken up by Discovery Park, formerly the U.S. Army's Fort Lawton.

Magnolia is isolated from the rest of Seattle, connected by road to the rest of the city by only three bridges over the tracks of the BNSF Railway: W. Emerson Street in the north, W. Dravus Street in the center, and W. Garfield Street (the Magnolia Bridge) in the south — the Salmon Bay Bridge to Ballard is rail-only, no motorized traffic is permitted to cross the Hiram M. Chittenden Locks, and the W. Fort Street bridge over the railroad tracks only affords access to the W. Commodore Way industrial area (traffic to the rest of the city from that area still needs to take the W. Emerson Street bridge).

== Boundaries ==
Magnolia is bounded on the north by Salmon Bay and Shilshole Bay of the Lake Washington Ship Canal, across which is Ballard; on the west by Puget Sound and Elliott Bay; on the south by Elliott Bay and Smith Cove; and on the east by the BNSF Railway and the Port of Seattle's Terminal 91, beyond which is Interbay.

Although magnolia trees do line W. McGraw Street in the neighborhood's commercial district, Magnolia's naming was a misnomer. It was named by Captain George Davidson of the U.S. Coast Survey in 1856, who reportedly mistook the plentiful madrona trees for magnolias. Groups are actively working to save the remaining madronas on the bluff.

On Magnolia's south end is Magnolia Park, overlooking Puget Sound, Mount Rainier, and the city skyline. It features a picnic area and tennis courts across the street. Also in Magnolia are Smith Cove and its marina. Discovery Park, in the northwest, encompasses 534 acres (2.16 km^{2}) and is Seattle's largest park. Seven miles of trails provide visitors with views of Puget Sound and the Olympic Mountains. Parts of Fort Lawton, such as the officers' homes and other historic buildings, remain in the park, though many are now private residences. Discovery Park has extensive beaches wrapping around West Point, the westernmost point in Seattle, and West Point hosts a lighthouse which guides ships into Seattle's harbor, Elliott Bay.

Adjacent to Discovery Park is West Point, featuring the West Point Lighthouse, which was built in 1881 and is the oldest lighthouse in the area. Walking trails descend from the park to two miles (3 km) of beach and the lighthouse. West Point also contains one of Seattle's sewage treatment facilities, and several archaeological sites.

== Highlights ==
Another highlight is the local branch of the Seattle Public Library, designed in 1964 by architects Paul Hayden Kirk and Richard Haag, who won top awards for design from the American Library Association. In the children's section is a statue of a young girl titled "Girl Holding Doves," designed by Ebba Rapp McLauchlan. Outside hangs a bronze wall sculpture titled "Activity of Thought," an abstract piece of art designed especially for the library by Glenn Alps. The library is furnished with solid walnut tables and chairs custom designed by George Nakashima.

Magnolia's business district, called "The Village" by locals, is home to many specialty stores, professional services, and restaurants. In the summer, there is a farmers market held on Saturdays in the Magnolia Village.

There are three Seattle Public Schools in Magnolia: Lawton Elementary, Magnolia Elementary, and Catharine Blaine K-8.

== Neighborhoods ==
According to the Seattle City Clerk's office, Magnolia comprises three neighborhoods (see map):

- Lawton Park – The northern half of Magnolia
- Briarcliff – The southwestern quarter of Magnolia
- Southeast Magnolia – The southeastern quarter of Magnolia
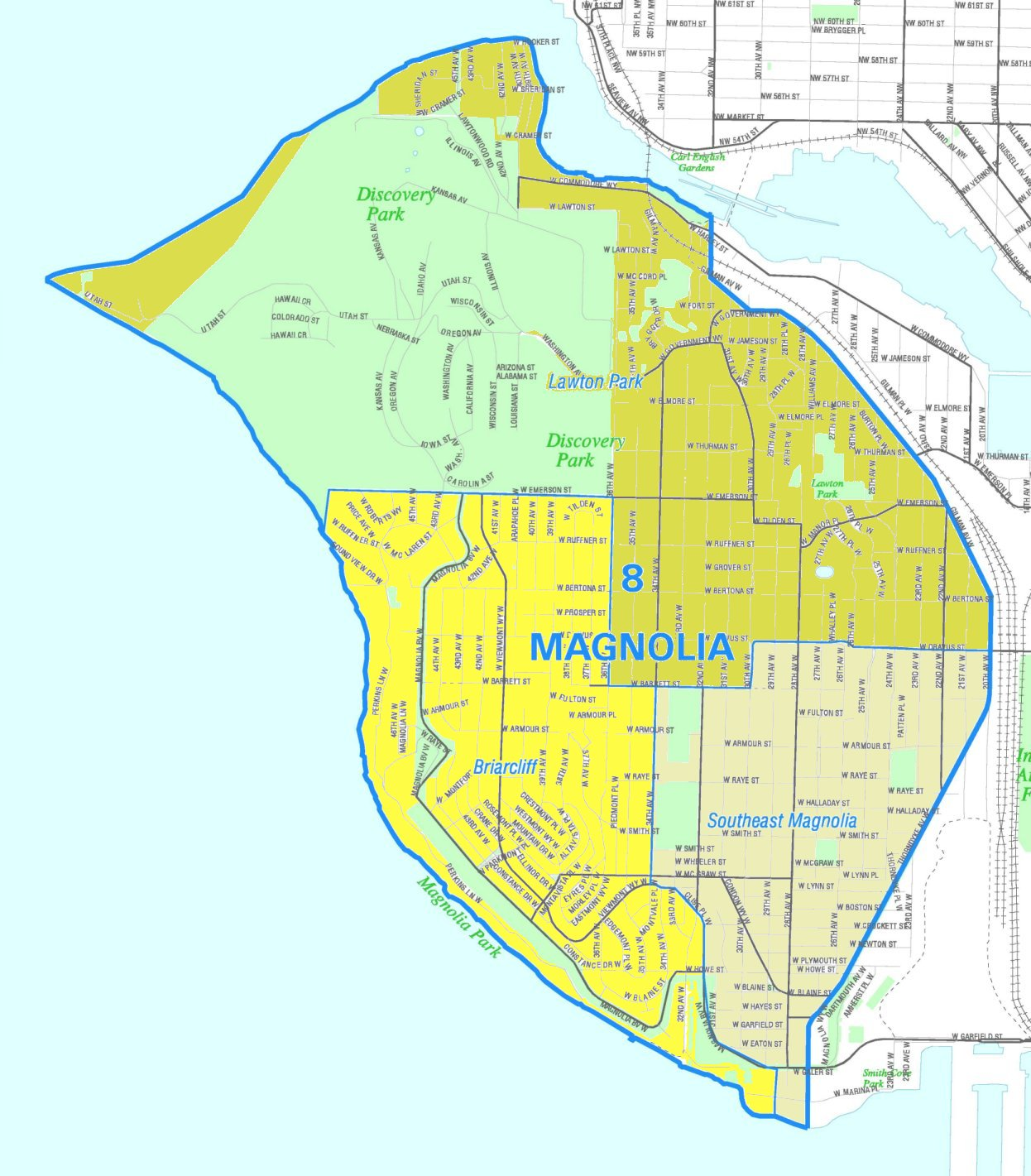
Map of Magnolia

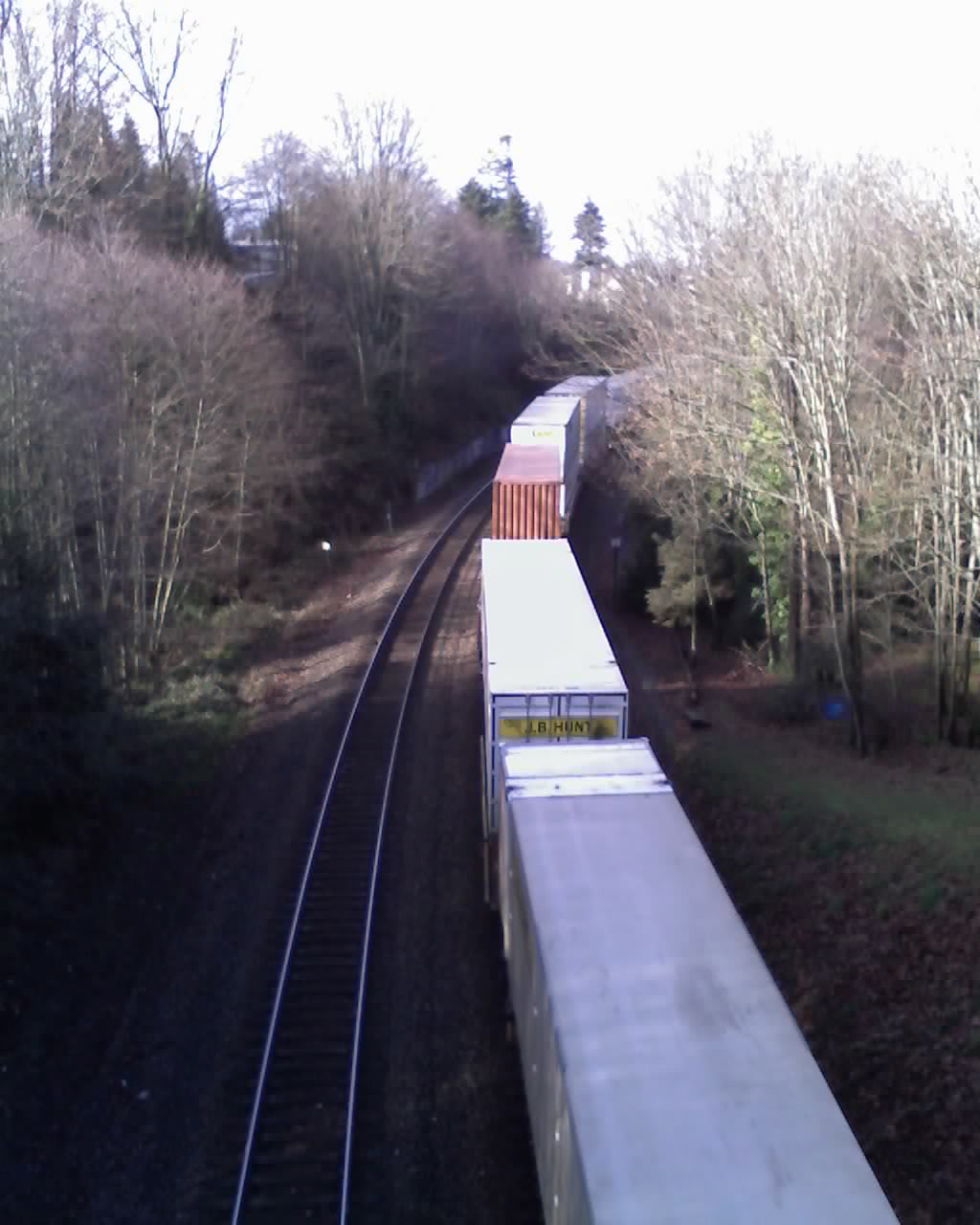
BNSF Railway tracks just north of Kiwanis Ravine

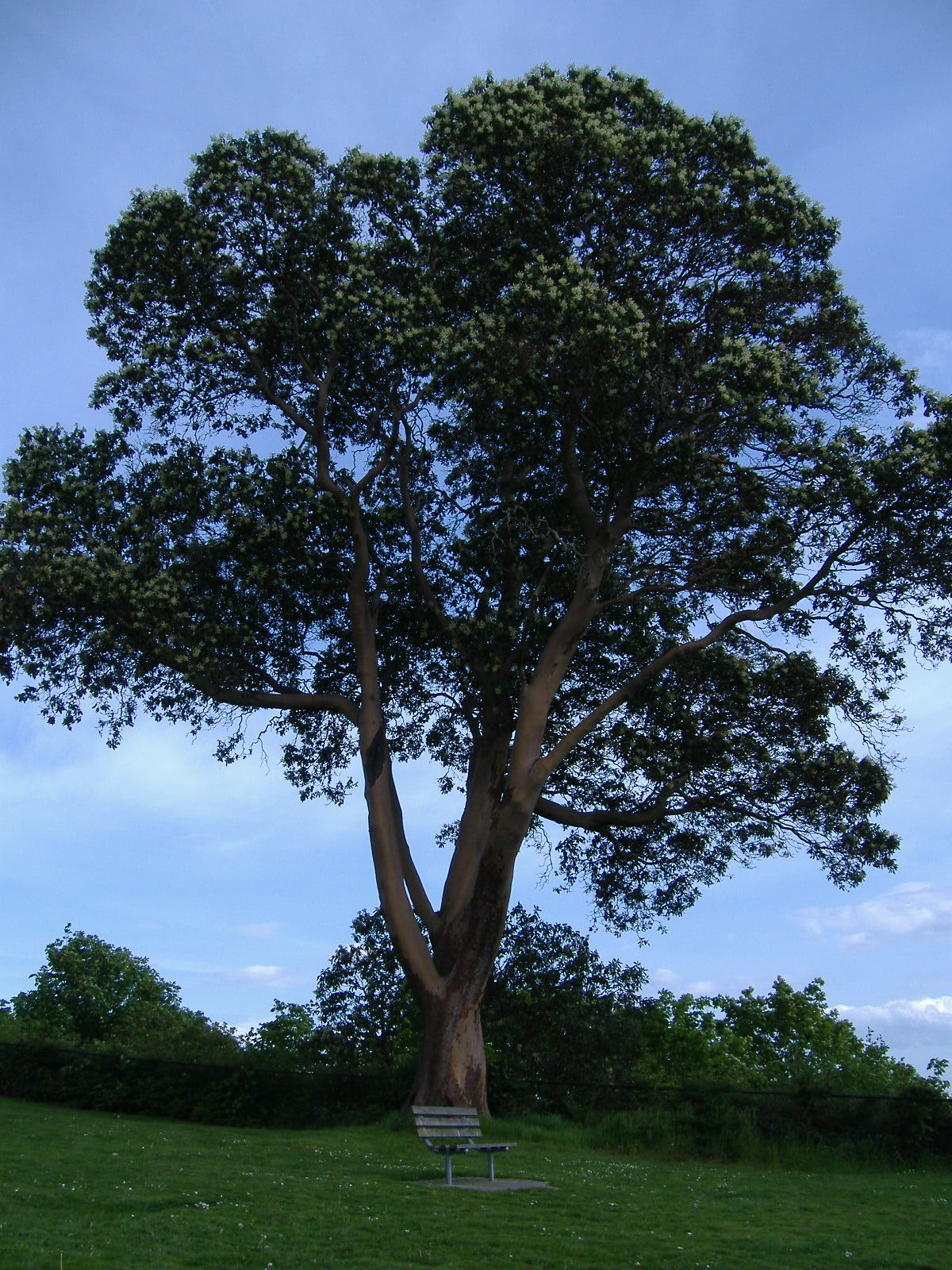
Park in Magnolia
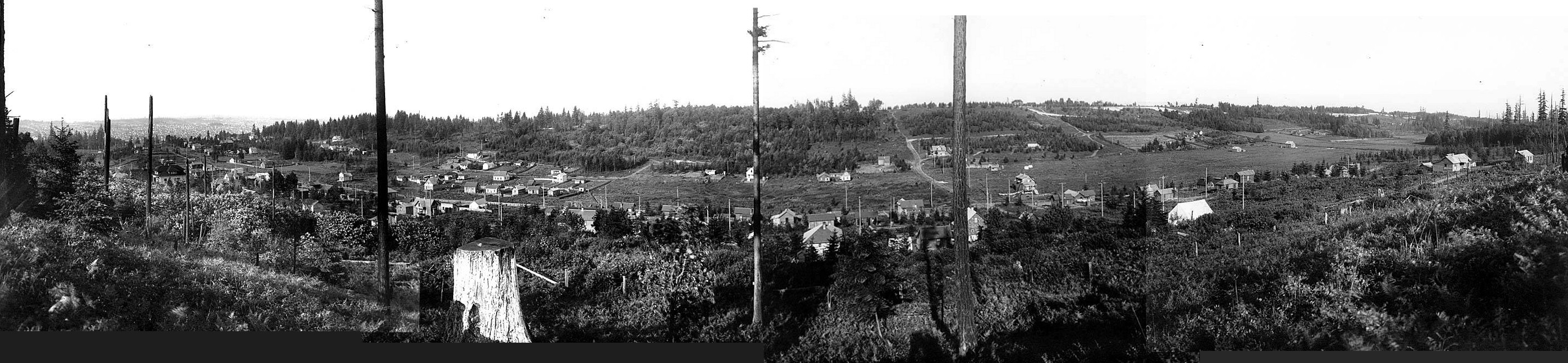
Pleasant Valley in 1909, slightly east of Fort Lawton, looking east.

== Demographics ==
As of the census of 2000, there were 19,156 people, 9,077 households, and 4,828 families residing in the neighborhood. There are 9,416 housing units. The racial makeup of the neighborhood was 87.4% White, 5.8% Asian, 1.6% African American, 0.6% Native American, 0.3% Pacific Islander, 1.0% from other races, and 3.2% from two or more races. Hispanic or Latino of any race were 3.3% of the population.

There were 9,077 households, out of which 20.6% had children under the age of 18 living with them, 45.2% were married couples living together, 5.8% had a female householder with no husband present, and 46.8% were non-families. 34.8% of all households were made up of individuals, and 10.5% had someone living alone who was 65 years of age or older. The average household size was 2.10 and the average family size was 2.73.

In the neighborhood the population was spread out, with 17.0% under the age of 18, 7.6% from 18 to 24, 34.8% from 25 to 44, 26.7% from 45 to 64, and 15.3% who were 65 years of age or older. The median age was 40.5 years. For every 100 females, there were 93.4 males. For every 100 females age 18 and over, there were 92.2 males.

The median income for a household in the neighborhood was $59,542, and the median income for a family was $79,842. Males had a median income of $51,561 versus $39,107 for females. The per capita income for the neighborhood was $37,754. About 2.3% of families and 5.1% of the population were below the poverty line, including 5.3% of those under age 18 and 5.3% of those age 65 or over.

== See also ==
- Commodore Park
- Elliott Bay Marina
