= Briarcliff, Seattle =

Coordinates: 47°38′42″N 122°24′31″W

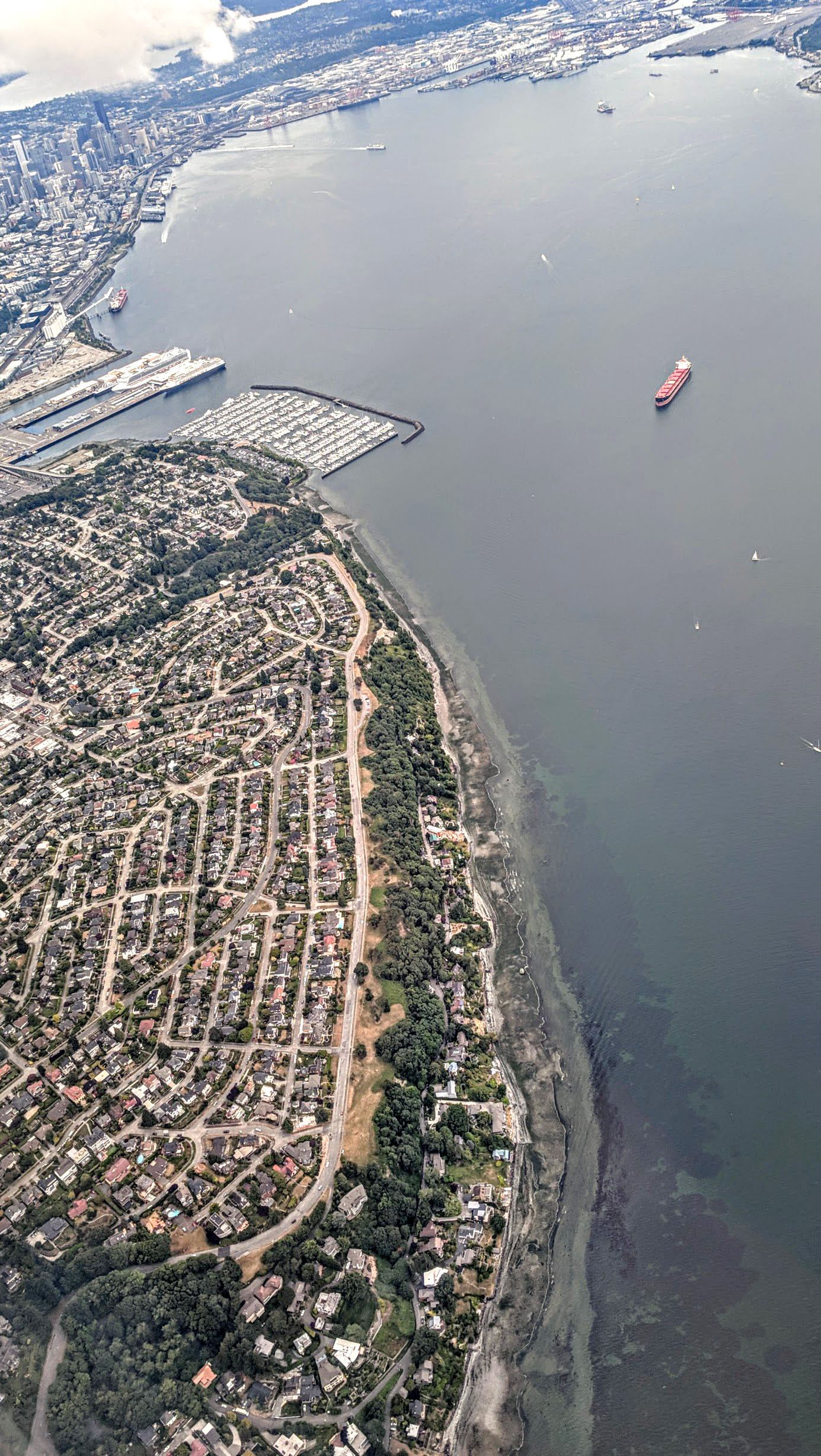
Aerial view from the north of Seattle's Briarcliff neighborhood, with Elliott Bay and downtown Seattle in the background

Briarcliff is a neighborhood in Seattle, Washington. The city's Department of Neighborhoods places Briarcliff on the west side of Magnolia, south of Discovery Park.

In 2015 the neighborhood was listed as having one of the five highest median residential real estate prices in Seattle according to a survey taken by Redfin. In 2014 Crosscut named Briarcliff "Seattle's least liberal neighborhood".
