= Balmer Yard =

Rail yard in the Interbay neighborhood of Seattle, Washington

Coordinates: 47.644214°N 122.381017°W

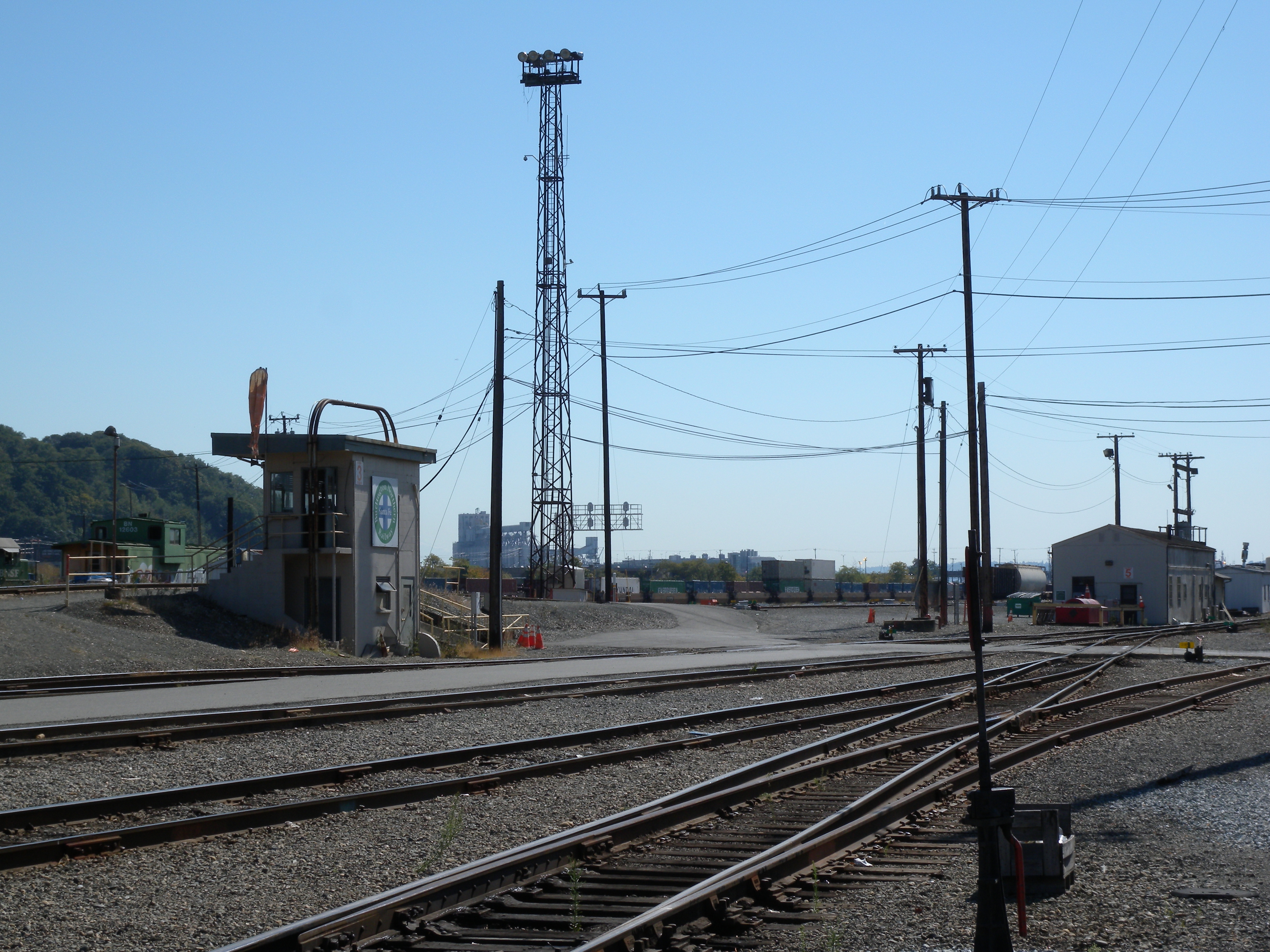
Balmer yard control tower

Balmer Yard was a rail yard located in the Interbay neighborhood of Seattle, Washington. Serving from 1900 until June of 2025, the yard is owned by BNSF Railway, and was built by predecessor Great Northern Railway as Interbay Yard. As part of a modernization in the late 1960s, which included a 16-track hump, which is no longer in service, it was renamed after former GN vice president Thomas Balmer. The nearby engine servicing area is still known as Interbay. The yard was over 80 acres (320,000 m^{2}) in size and has 41 parallel tracks for switching cars.

== See also ==
- List of rail yards
