= Magnolia Park (Seattle) =

Park in Seattle, Washington, United States

Coordinates: 47°38′00″N 122°23′54″W

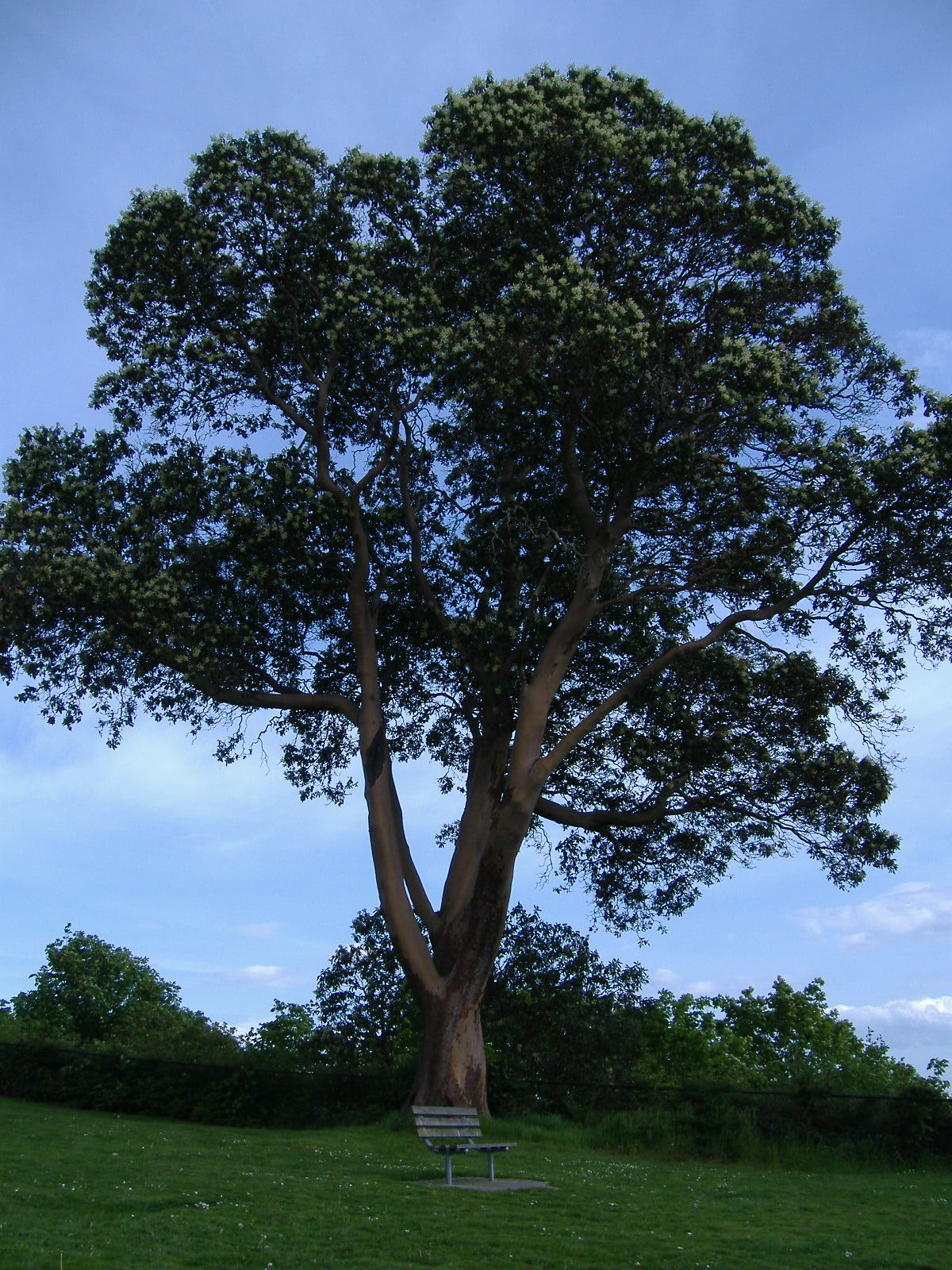
- A madrone in Magnolia Park
- Interactive map of Magnolia Park
- Location: Magnolia, Seattle, Washington, United States

Magnolia Park is a 12.1-acre (4.9 ha) park in the Magnolia neighborhood of Seattle, Washington.

According to the Seattle Parks and Recreation Department:

The Magnolia neighborhood and park were misnamed by a Navy geographer who wrongly identified the area's madrona trees as magnolias.
