= Salmon Bay =

Bay in Seattle, Washington

Coordinates: 47.66°N 122.38°W

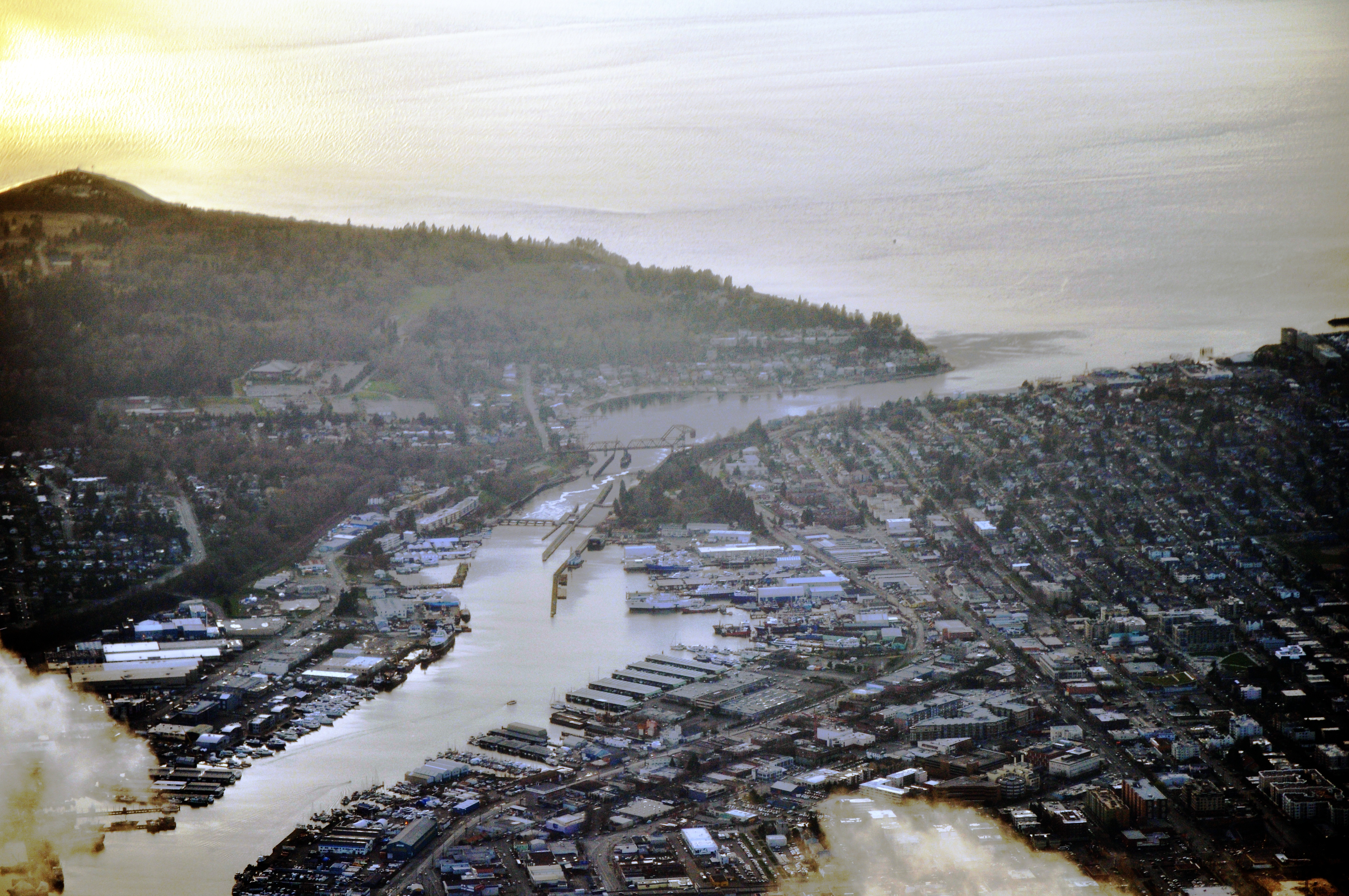
View of Salmon Bay, with Puget Sound in the background. The bridge in the foreground is the Hiram M. Chittenden Locks; the bridge closer to Puget Sound is the Salmon Bay Bridge.

Salmon Bay (Lushootseed: šilšul) is a portion of the Lake Washington Ship Canal, which passes through the city of Seattle, linking Lake Washington to Puget Sound, lying west of the Fremont Cut. It is the westernmost section of the canal and empties into Puget Sound's Shilshole Bay. Because of the Hiram M. Chittenden Locks, the smaller, western half of the bay is salt water, and the eastern half is fresh water (though not without saline contamination: see Lake Union).

== History ==
Before the construction of the Ship Canal, Salmon Bay was entirely salt water and subject to the tides. The bay was the permanent home of the Shilshole people, a Lushootseed-speaking people closely related to the Duwamish. The Lushootseed name of the bay is šilšul, which is the origin of the name of the Shilshole people (šilšulabš). Along the north side of the bay was a village (also called šilšul) of the Shilshole, which by the late 19th century, had two longhouses (each 60'x120') and a larger potlatch house. At this time, the headman of the village was Shilshole Curly. Although much of the population left the village, a community still remained living in the village until the early 1900s. The village was destroyed in the 1910s and the residents removed. Some assimilated into the local community while others moved to local reservations. The last remaining resident of the village was Salmon Bay Charlie until he was evicted and removed to the Port Madison Reservation.

Beginning in 1916, the level of the bay was raised by 20 feet (6.1 m) as the Ballard Locks formed a dam. East of the locks, Salmon Bay is spanned by the Ballard Bridge, a bascule bridge that carries 15th Avenue traffic between Ballard and Interbay; its predecessor was built across the bay in 1891. West of the locks, it is spanned by the Salmon Bay Bridge that carries the BNSF Railway railroad tracks between Ballard and Magnolia.

In the 1920s, an archaeological dig of the western parts of the site of the former Shilshole village was conducted by A. G. Colley. Archaeologists found many tools, including those made of iron, as a result of the dig.

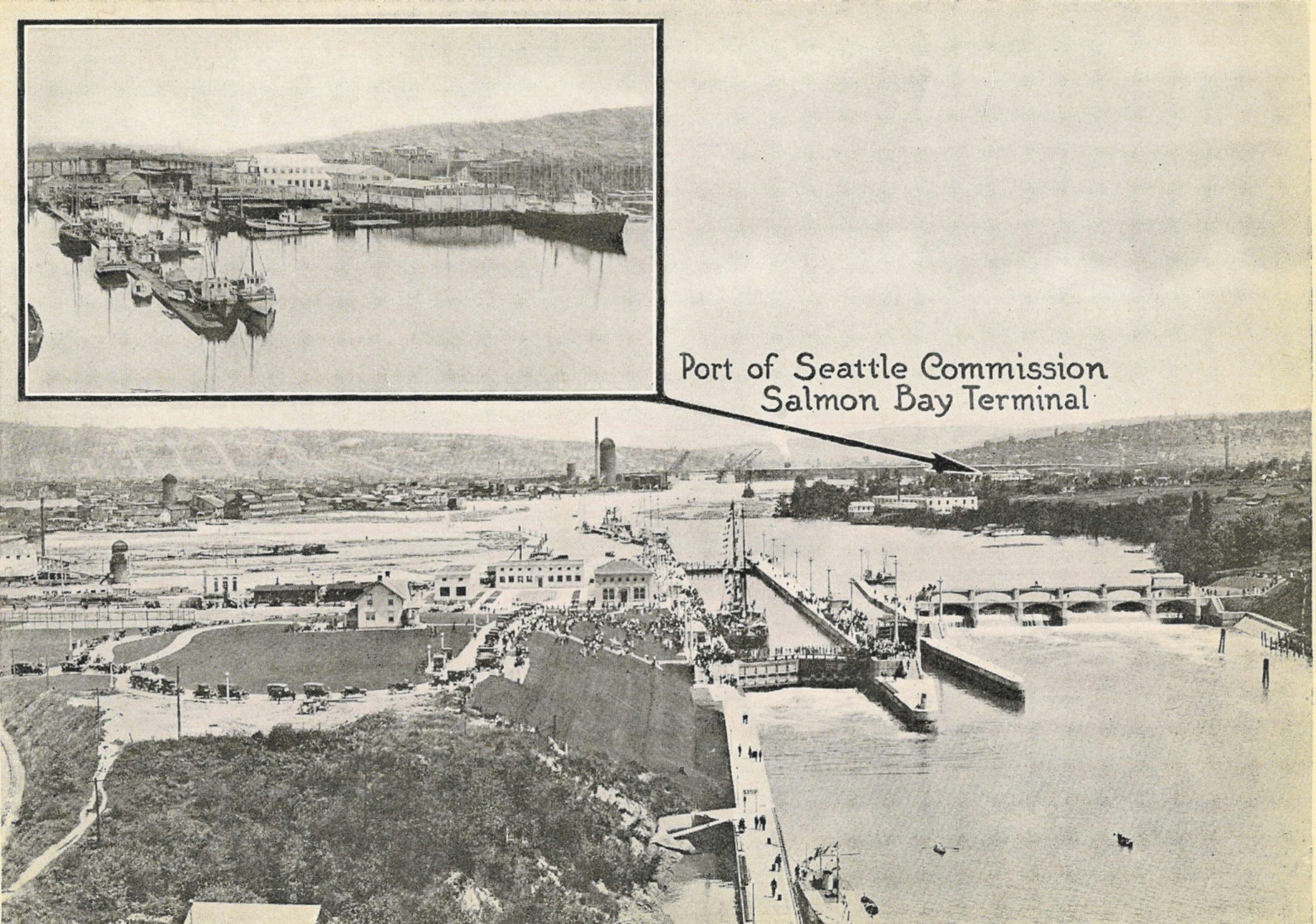
In 1919 the Fishermen's Terminal was known as the "Salmon Bay Terminal"

The house of Salmon Bay Charlie, the last resident of the Shilshole village (c. 1905)
