= Seacrest Cove 2 =

Recreational dive site in West Seattle, Washington

Coordinates: 47.589°N 122.380°W

Seacrest Cove 2 also known as Alki Cove 2 is a local dive site in West Seattle, Washington. The site within Seacrest Park is the most popular diving location in Seattle.

Cove 2 is often used as a training site for open water, navigation and other scuba classes. The site has a moderate slope leading down to depths greater than the recreational limit of 130 feet (40 meters). Because of the easily reached deep areas, technical divers also use Cove 2 for training. The site has a silty bottom, but many submerged logs, pilings and sunken boats (the Honey Bear) that are well decorated with Pacific Northwest marine life. There are restrooms in the pier building. The site has a view of the Seattle skyline across Elliott Bay. There is an exclusion zone of 150 feet around the walk-on ferry dock. Other sites (Coves 1 and 3) are just to the north and south respectively. Most parking is curbside on the street.
