= Magnolia Bridge =

Bridge and viaduct in Seattle, Washington, United States

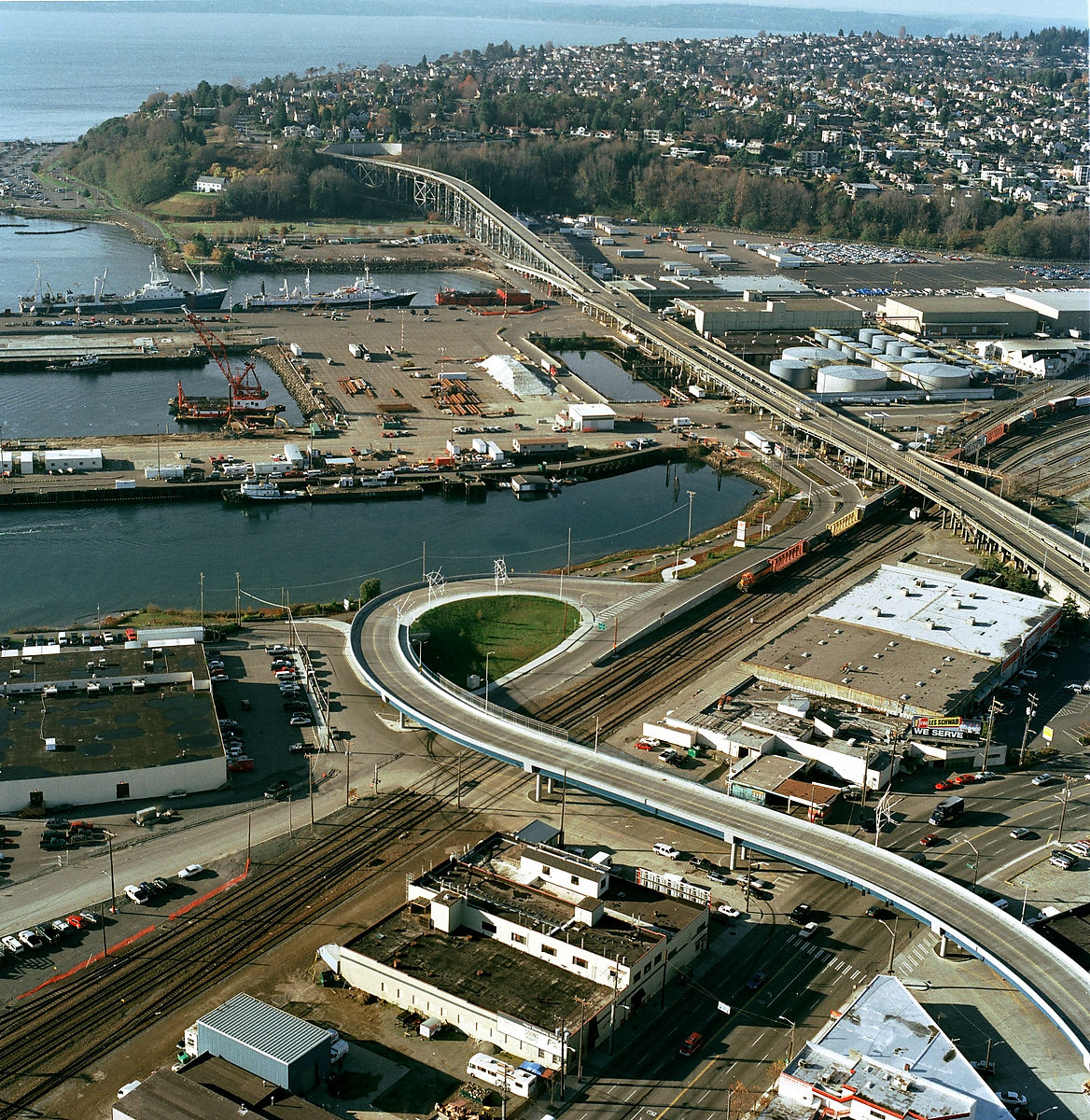
- Coordinates: 47°38′0.6″N 122°22′58.6″W
- Carries: W. Garfield Street
- Crosses: Smith Cove
- Locale: Seattle, Washington, U.S.

The Magnolia Bridge is a warren deck truss bridge that carries automobile traffic in Seattle, Washington, United States. It was built in 1930 and connects the neighborhoods of Magnolia and Interbay over the filled-in tidelands of Smith Cove. The bridge is one of only four road connections from Magnolia to the rest of Seattle. It carries W. Garfield Street from Magnolia Way W. in the west to the intersection of Elliott and 15th Avenues W. in the east.

In 1910, when a bridge was first proposed for this location, Queen Anne Hill and Magnolia were already connected by several trestles across Interbay, each spanning the railway that ran north–south through Interbay. By 1912 a wooden trestle had been built. The wooden trestle was replaced by a concrete structure in 1930 and improved in 1957 to provide a grade separation from Elliott Avenue West. In 1960 the bridge was renamed from the "Garfield Street Bridge" to the "Magnolia Bridge" as a result of community efforts by Magnolia residents.

The bridge's support columns were damaged by the 2001 Nisqually earthquake, temporarily closing it for repairs. As part of disaster-relief funding after the earthquake, a replacement for the Magnolia Bridge was granted $9 million in federal funds, but design of the new bridge stalled in the late 2000s.

== See also ==
- List of Seattle bridges
