= Elliott Bay Marina =

Marina in Seattle, Washington, U.S.

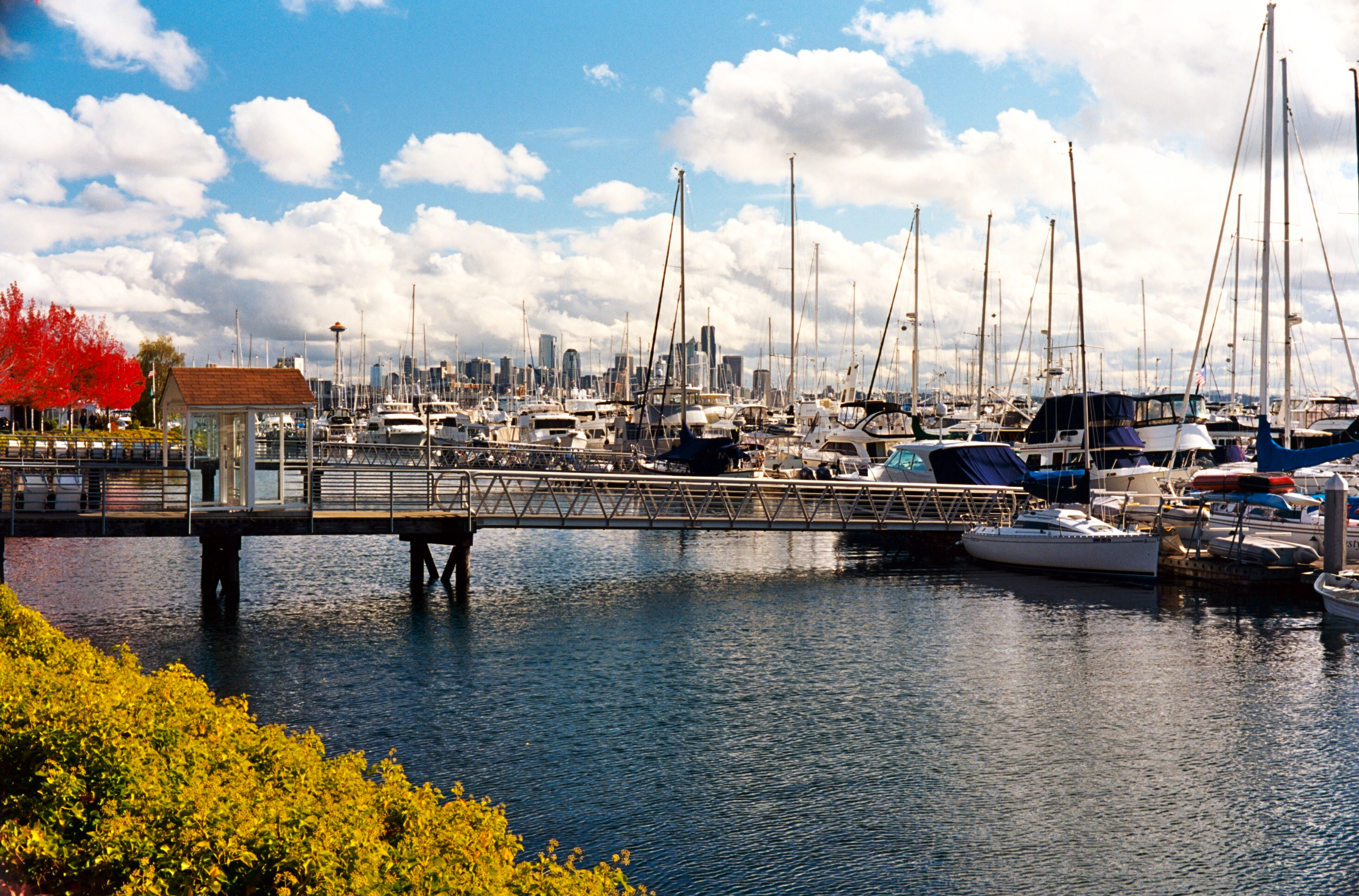
- View from shore of the marina
- Type: Marina
- Carries: Sailboats, powerboats
- Location: Magnolia, Seattle
- Coordinates: 47.630809°N 122.391651°W

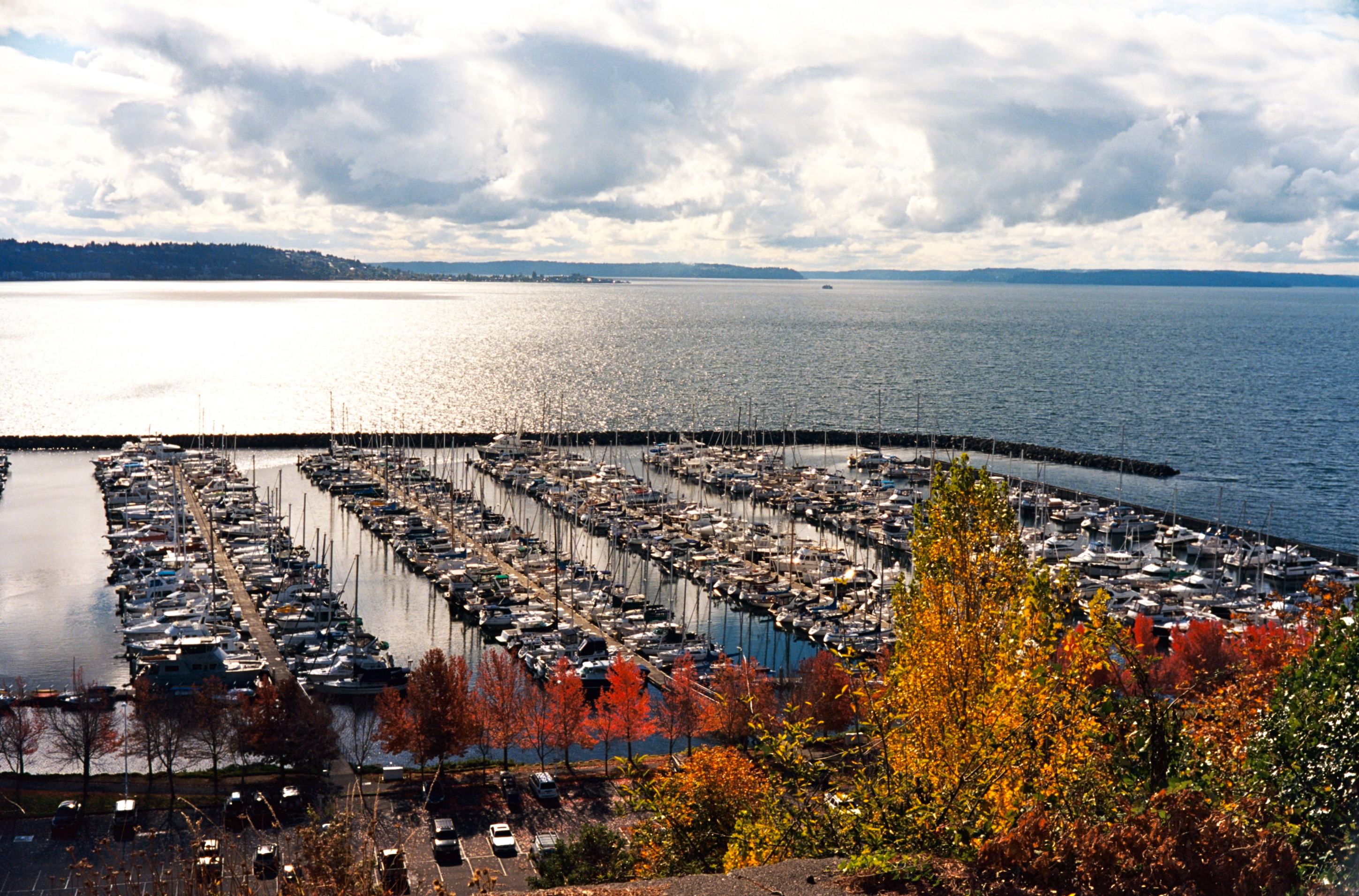
View from Magnolia

Elliott Bay Marina is a private marina located in Seattle, Washington. It opened in 1991, after 17 years in the planning and permit process. There are 1,200 slips available for moorage ranging in size from 28 to 120 feet with 52% of the boats between 36 and 50 feet LOA. There is transient moorage for super yachts up to 300 feet LOA.

The boat types are evenly split between sailboats and powerboats, which reflects the great sailing conditions on Puget Sound. Forty boats are liveaboards. Another 60 slips must remain available for transient boaters per agreement with the city.

The marina hosts the Downtown Sailing Series on Thursday nights during the summer.

== Marine Services ==
In addition to overnight moorage, services available include gasoline and diesel fuel, a stationary pumpout station, a Porta-Potty dump station, and electrical hook ups at 30, 50, and 100 amps.

== Environmental improvements ==
There are three aspects to Elliott Bay Marina's environmental improvements: the temporary steps taken during construction to reduce or ease the negative impacts on marine life; physical features built into the marina to enhance, protect, and encourage marine life; and operational practices that control pollutants or prevent them from entering the water:

- Habitat and water assessment
- Hazardous waste program
- Dog waste collection
- Education

== Other environmental enhancements ==
The 900-car parking lot was built with a series of storm water drains and traps for separating petroleum from the runoff. More than 500 trees, 6,000 shrubs, and wide lawns were planted to act as runoff buffers, control erosion, and beautify the area. The marina fuel dock was designed with double-walled tanks and fuel lines, all equipped with monitors, sensors, and automatic shutoff should a leak occur. Oil booms, spill containment kits, and an aluminum pontoon boat are at the ready should a spill occur in the marina, or to head off one that is drifting in from nearby commercial shipping piers.
