= Interbay, Seattle =

Interbay
- Seattle Neighborhood
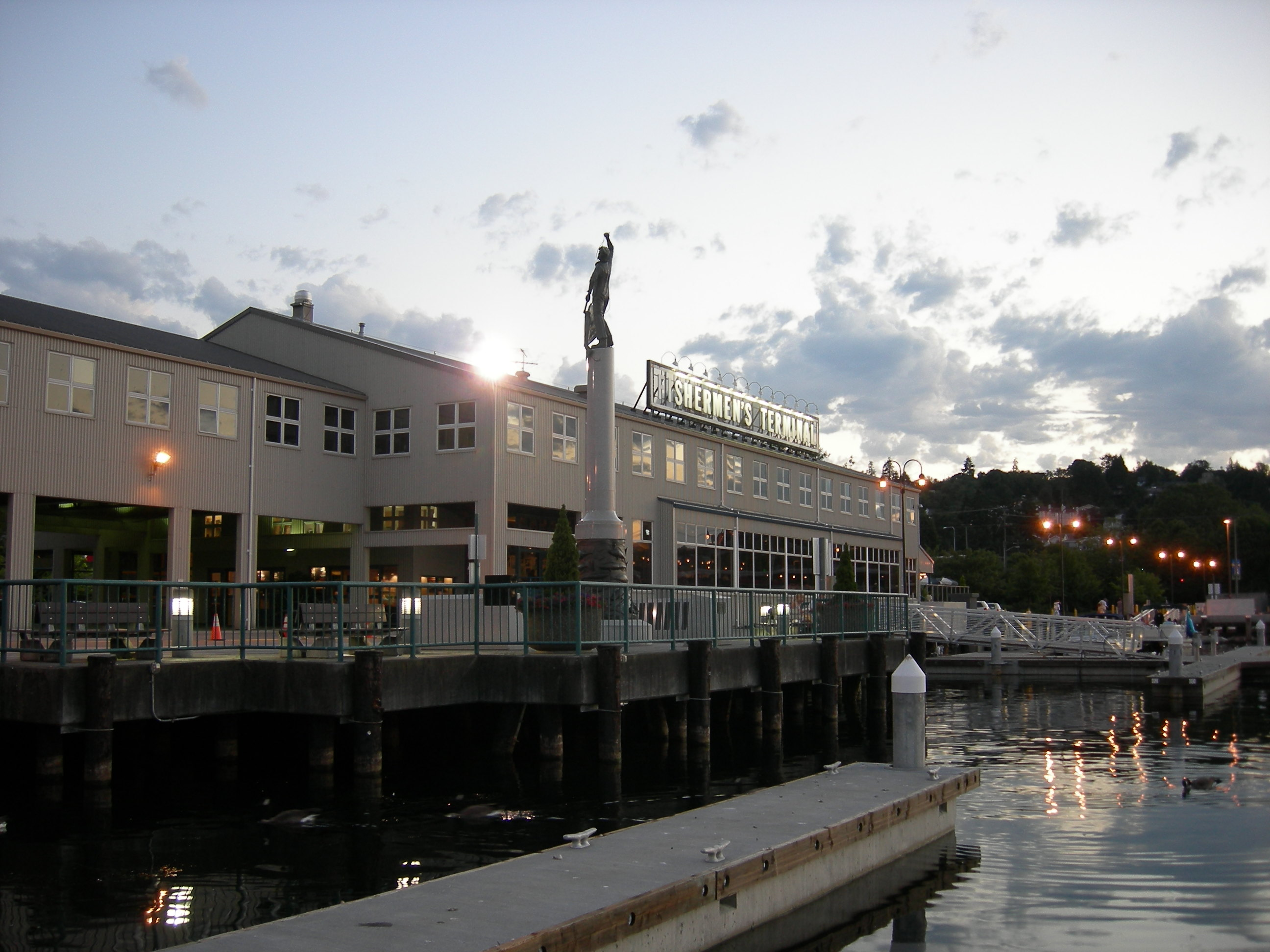
- The Fishermen's Terminal marina on Salmon Bay, at the north end of Interbay

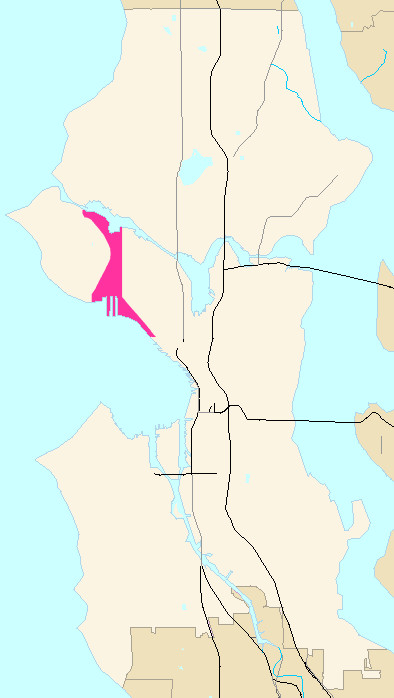
- Map of Interbay's location in Seattle
- Coordinates: 47°38′47″N 122°22′48″W

Area
  - Total: 3.58 km^{2} (1.382 sq mi)

Population
  - Total: 4,546
  - Density: 1,270/km^{2} (3,289/sq mi)

Interbay is a neighborhood in northwestern Seattle, Washington. It consists of the valley between Queen Anne Hill on the east and Magnolia on the west, plus filled-in areas of Smith Cove and Salmon Bay. The neighborhood is bounded on the north by Salmon Bay, part of the Lake Washington Ship Canal, across which is Ballard; on the south by what remains of Smith Cove, an inlet of Elliott Bay; on the east by 15th Avenue W. and Elliott Avenue W.; and on the west by the BNSF Railway. The Ballard Bridge crosses the ship canal from Interbay to Ballard.

Much of Interbay is taken up by BNSF Railway's Balmer Yard. Interbay is also home to Fishermen's Terminal on Salmon Bay and the Port of Seattle's Piers 86, 90, and 91 on Smith Cove. Its main thoroughfares are Elliott Avenue W. (northwest- and southeast-bound) and 15th Avenue W. (north- and southbound).

== History ==
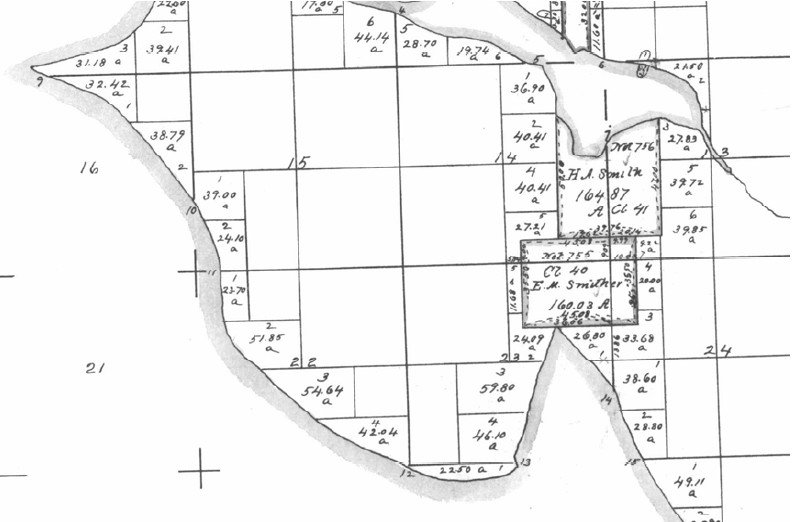
This 1863 Government Land Office map of Interbay (and much of Magnolia) shows the claim by H. A. Smith extending south from Salmon Bay; immediately south of that, extending to Smith Cove, is the claim of Erasmus M. Smithers. The map also shows the natural shape of the land before the dredging of a canal to the northeast and the filling of much of the cove to the south.

It appears that the valley between Magnolia and Queen Anne was carved out during the Vashon Stade of the Fraser glaciation (roughly 14,000–17,000 years ago), A thin layer of sand throughout the area may date from a tsunami following an earthquake along the Seattle Fault Zone about 1,000 years ago.

Although Interbay fell within the traditional geographic range of the Duwamish, early ethnographers did not record contact-era or earlier Native American villages in the area. Nonetheless, University of Washington ethnologist T. T. Waterman lists several native place names at or near Smith Cove and Salmon Bay.

The Denny Party saw Interbay's development potential when they explored the area in 1852, but chose to settle farther south. Their settlement became the core of Seattle. Meanwhile, most of Interbay came to be owned by Erasmus M. Smithers (1830–1905), later the founder of Renton, and Ohio-born physician and poet Henry A. Smith (1830–1915), after whom Smith's Cove is now named. Smith and his wife, mother, and sister began with a claim on Salmon Bay near the present-day Ballard, and steadily acquired more land, extending their holdings south through Interbay to Smith Cove. In particular, the Smiths bought when so many other were selling during the 1855–56 Indian War (see Battle of Seattle).

Smith established a settlement known as Boulevard roughly halfway between Smith Cove and Salmon Bay, along a street he called Grand Boulevard (present-day West Dravus Street). He farmed, practiced medicine, and wrote. His most famous piece of writing, published in the 1880s, purported to be an English-language rendering of Chief Seattle's speech on the occasion of an 1854 treaty conference; there is question about the authenticity of the translation.

In 1884 the Seattle, Lake Shore and Eastern Railway (SLSER) purchased all but 50 acres (20 ha) of Smith's 9,600 acres (3,900 ha) in Interbay and built a north–south rail line through the area. The train stopped on Grand Boulevard near Gilman and Thorndyke Avenues, spurring further commercial development and the rise of a blue-collar village. In 1891, Seattle annexed Magnolia and Interbay, including Boulevard. By 1894, the post office name had been changed from "Boulevard" to "Interbay", the name that has continued to this day.

The railway route through Interbay eventually came under the control of James J. Hill and the Great Northern Railway, as did much of at Smith Cove. Hill established a major depot and port at the cove, including Piers 38 and 39 (later renumbered 88 and 89)(now demolished), which were located east of present-day Piers 90 and 91. In 1896 Nippon Yusen Kaisha established the first regular steamship service between Asia and the Pacific Coast of North America, with Smith Cove as its American port.

During the 1911–1916 construction of the Lake Washington Ship Canal along Salmon Bay, about 150 acres (61 ha) of Smith Cove tidelands were filled with material from the dredging. The then (1911) new Port of Seattle built Fishermen's Terminal on Salmon Bay at the north end of Interbay and bought the Great Northern docks and approximately 20 acres (8.1 ha) at Smith's Cove, where they developed two new coal and lumber piers, today's Piers 90 and 91. These developments at either end of Interbay led to the increasing industrialization of the area.

This maritime trade spurred the rise of companies in Interbay including rope factory Portland Cordage, Rudd Paint Manufacturing, Berquist's Vinegar Works, and the Chicago Junk Company (later Tsubota Steel and Pipe Company). Finns, Poles, Russians, Germans, Austrians, and Scots figured prominently among those who settled and worked in the neighborhood.

The Asian trade out of Smith Cove continued until 1934, when the violence there accompanying the Maritime Strike of 1934 led to a diversion of this trade to the Port of Los Angeles.

During the Great Depression, Interbay was the site of one of Seattle's Hoovervilles.

From 1941 into the early 1970s, Smith Cove served as a supply depot for the United States Navy, before returning to use as a civilian port. A few buildings and warehouses can still be found on the site that trace back to that time, including Quarters A, also known as "The Admiral's House", perched on the SW corner of Magnolia and overlooking piers 90 and 91. The large white painted home is now in private ownership and used as an event space.

A proposed modern monorail would have run along 15th Ave NW, but the initiative collapsed in 2005 after eight years of contention. The D Line runs along 15th Ave W, from 2012 to present. A transit center for the new Expedia office complex was completed in 2019. The route of the Link expansion to Ballard will pass along the Interbay corridor.

== Bridging Interbay ==
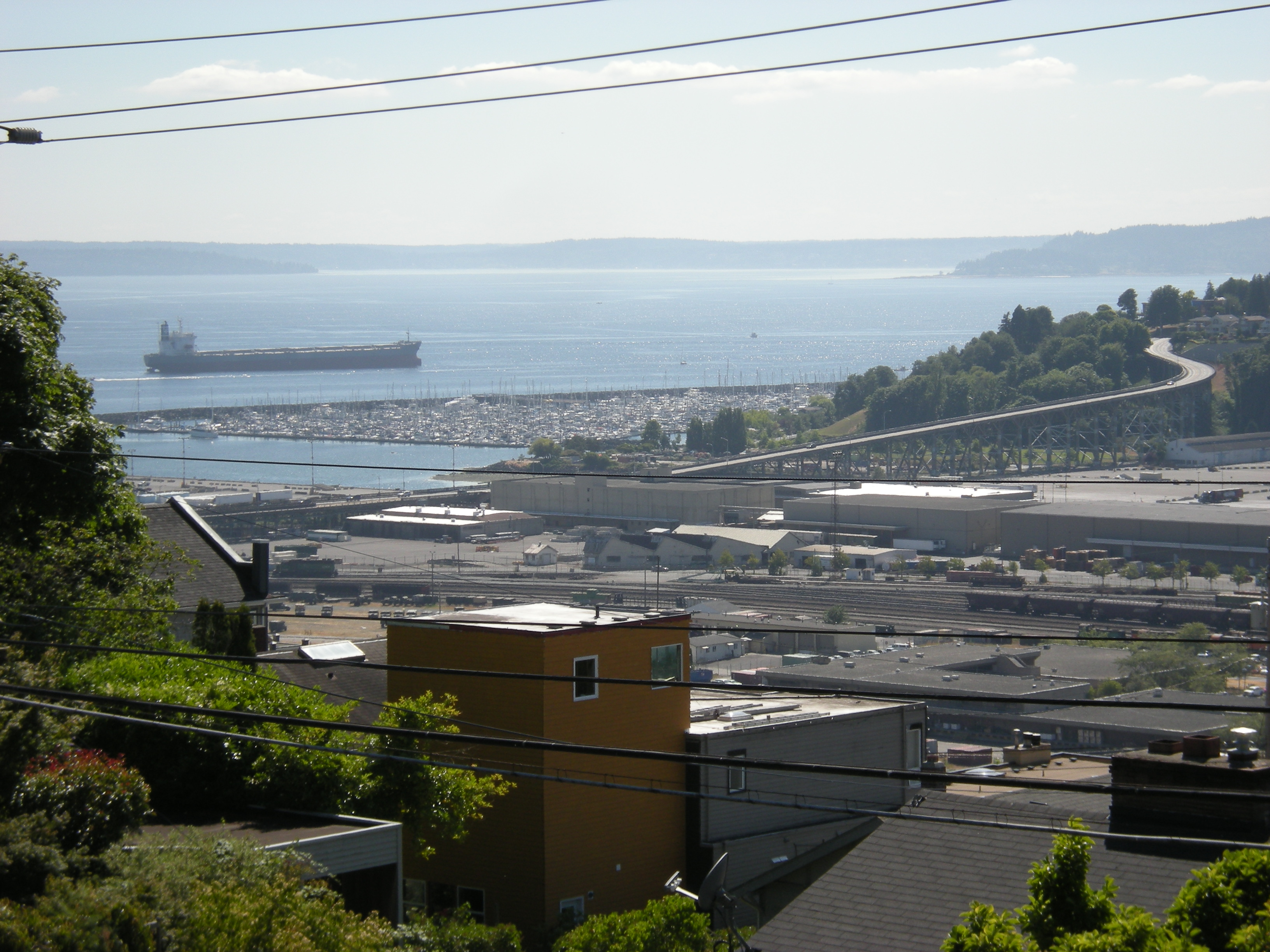
The Magnolia Bridge crosses former Smith Cove tideflats near the south end of Interbay. Seen here from Soundview Terrace on Queen Anne Hill.

The southern part of Interbay was originally the Smith Cove tideflats. All of Interbay was divided from the 1880s onward by an increasing number of north–south railway lines. This motivated numerous bridges and trestles running east–west across the neighborhood. The first of these was at Grand Boulevard (now West Dravus Street). Around 1900 there was both a roadway and a trestle at Grand Boulevard for the Seattle-Fort Lawton street trolley line. The first of several bridges across Smith Cove at Garfield Street Bridge (site of the current Magnolia Bridge) was built some time between 1910 and 1912. The 23rd Avenue West trestle and the South Shore trestle were both western extensions of the West Garfield Street Bridge, leading to different points in Magnolia to the West. The Wheeler Street Bridge was a complex of four trestles. The Wheeler Street West trestle ran from 15th Avenue West to Thorndyke Avenue West. The Lawton Way trestle intersected that at a diagonal and trestle extensions ran to both 20th Avenue West and Halliday Street on the Magnolia Bluffs.

As of 2008, besides the Magnolia Bridge over the former tideflats and the West Dravus trestle, Interbay is also spanned by a flyover from Nickerson Street at West Emerson Place, just south of Salmon Bay and the Fishermen's Terminal, near the south end of the Ballard Bridge. There is no longer a crossing at Wheeler Street (just south of the Interbay Golf Course).

== Interbay today ==
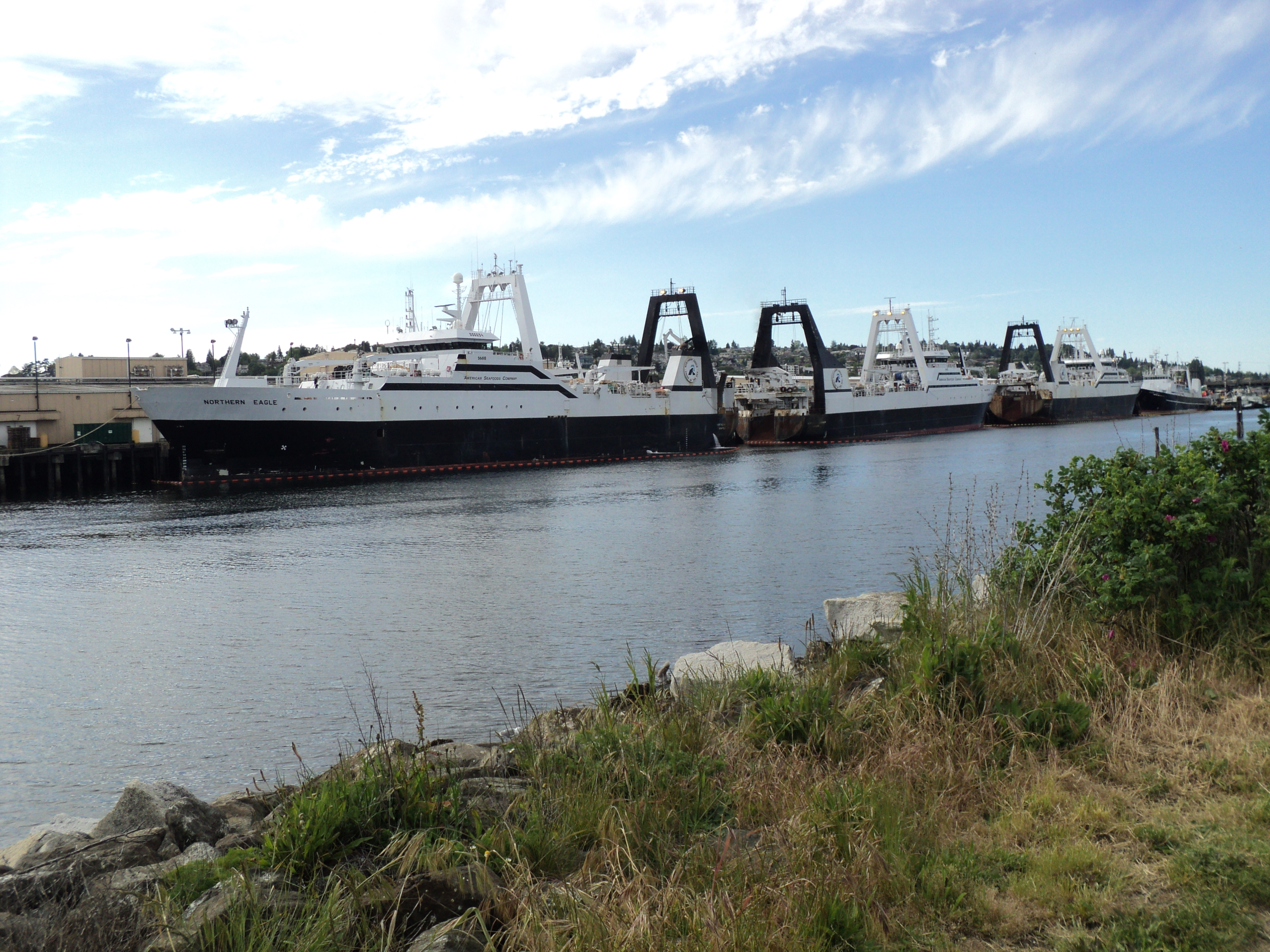
Fishing trawlers moored in Smith Cove at Interbay

Interbay today remains home to BNSF Railway's Balmer Yard and related locomotive maintenance shops, the Port of Seattle's Fishermen's Terminal on Salmon Bay and Piers 86, 90, and 91 on Smith Cove, and related facilities. It is also home to a Washington Army National Guard armory, Interbay Stadium, the Interbay P-Patch (a large community garden), and the Interbay Golf Course. Five late 19th century houses near Smith Cove, known as the Fourteenth Avenue West Group, have official status as a city landmark. There is a miscellany of light industrial, warehouse, wholesale, and retail businesses along 15th Avenue West, as well as a few professional offices and some housing. There continues to be a small shopping and dining neighborhood at West Dravus Street, the former Grand Boulevard. Near the Magnolia Bridge on 15th is the Center for Sex Positive Culture. A bicycle and foot trail comes north from the Central Waterfront by Belltown through Myrtle Edwards Park continues through the pier facilities around Smith Cove and parallels the railway tracks on their west through Interbay, ending on the west (Magnolia) side of the tracks on 20th Avenue West about three blocks south of Dravus. On April 2, 2015 Expedia, Inc. announced their purchase of the Amgen "Helix" facility along Elliot Ave. for $228.9m and their plans to move their corporate headquarters there from Bellevue, Washington by 2018.
