= USS Midland =

Cargo ship of the United States Navy

History

United States
- Name: Coastal Harbinger (1944–1945); Midland (1945)
- Namesake: Midland County, Michigan, and; Midland County, Texas
- Ordered: as type (C1-M-AV1) hull, MC hull 2126
- Builder: Walter Butler Shipbuilders, Inc., Superior, Wisconsin
- Yard number: 44
- Laid down: 29 July 1944
- Launched: 23 December 1944
- Sponsored by: Mrs. William G. Mitsch
- Acquired: 17 August 1945
- Commissioned: 27 September 1945
- Decommissioned: 13 November 1945
- Stricken: date unknown
- Identification: Hull symbol: AK-195; Code letters: NEOI
- Fate: Transferred to the Maritime Commission, 13 November 1945

History

United States
- Name: Coastal Spartan
- Owner: Maritime Commission
- Operator: States Marine Corporation (1945); North Atlantic & Gulf SS Company (1946); Dichman, Wright & Pugh (1948)
- Acquired: 13 November 1945
- In service: 13 November 1945
- Out of service: 3 February 1948
- Fate: Sold, 1 June 1948
- Notes: sold without cost

History

(Taiwan) Republic of China
- Name: Union Banker
- Acquired: 1 June 1948
- Fate: Scrapped, 1970

General characteristics
- Class & type: Alamosa-class cargo ship
- Type: C1-M-AV1
- Tonnage: 5,032 long tons deadweight (DWT)
- Displacement: 2,382 long tons (2,420 t) (standard); 7,450 long tons (7,570 t) (full load)
- Length: 388 ft 8 in (118.47 m)
- Beam: 50 ft (15 m)
- Draft: 21 ft 1 in (6.43 m)
- Installed power: 1 × Nordberg, TSM 6 diesel engine; 1,750 shp (1,300 kW)
- Propulsion: 1 × propeller
- Speed: 11.5 kn (21.3 km/h; 13.2 mph)
- Capacity: 3,945 t (3,883 long tons) DWT; 9,830 cu ft (278 m^{3}) (refrigerated); 227,730 cu ft (6,449 m^{3}) (non-refrigerated)
- Complement: 15 Officers; 70 Enlisted
- Armament: 1 × 3 in (76 mm)/50-caliber dual-purpose gun (DP); 6 × 20 mm (0.8 in) Oerlikon anti-aircraft (AA) cannons

USS Midland (AK-195) was an Alamosa-class cargo ship that was constructed by the US Navy during the closing period of World War II. She was declared excess-to-needs and returned to the US Maritime Commission shortly after being in commission for only a short period of time.

== Construction ==
Midland was laid down under Maritime Commission contract, MC hull 2126, by Walter Butler Shipbuilders, Inc., Superior, Wisconsin, 29 July 1944; launched 23 December 1944; sponsored by Mrs. William G. Mitsch; converted by the New Orleans Naval Station; acquired by the Navy from the Maritime Commission on loan-charter 17 August 1945; placed in service the same day to be ferried from Beaumont, Texas, to Galveston, Texas, and placed out of service upon arrival on 18 August; and commissioned 27 September 1945.

== Post-war decommissioning ==
Because of the reduced need for cargo ships following World War II, Midland decommissioned at New Orleans, Louisiana, 13 November 1945 and was returned to the War Shipping Administration (WSA) the same day for service under the Maritime Commission as Coastal Harbinger.

== Merchant service ==
Coastal Harbinger was used by several shipping companies from 1945 to 1948, when she was placed in the reserve fleet before being sold.

On 1 June 1948, she was sold to The Republic of China for "no cost" and renamed Union Banker. She was scrapped in 1970.

== Notes ==
Citations

== Bibliography ==
Online resources

- "Midland". Dictionary of American Naval Fighting Ships. Naval History and Heritage Command. This article incorporates text from this source, which is in the public domain.
- "C1 Cargo Ships". www.ShipbuildingHistory.com. 28 August 2009.
- "USS Midland (AK-195)". NavSource. 8 November 2013.
- "Coastal Expounder". United States Department of Transportation. Archived from the original on November 4, 2016.
