= George McManus (disambiguation) =

George McManus (1884–1954) was an American cartoonist, creator of Bringing up Father.

George McManus may also refer to:

- George McManus (baseball) (1846–1918), baseball manager
- George McManus (politician) (1806–1887), Ontario MPP
- George A. McManus Jr. (1930–2024), American politician, member of the Michigan Senate
- George H. McManus (1867–1954), U.S. Army general
- George Stewart McManus (1887–1981), US pianist and academic at UCLA
