= Boston Port of Embarkation =

United States Army command

Red Cross workers waving to troops aboard an Army transport leaving the Boston Port of Embarkation.

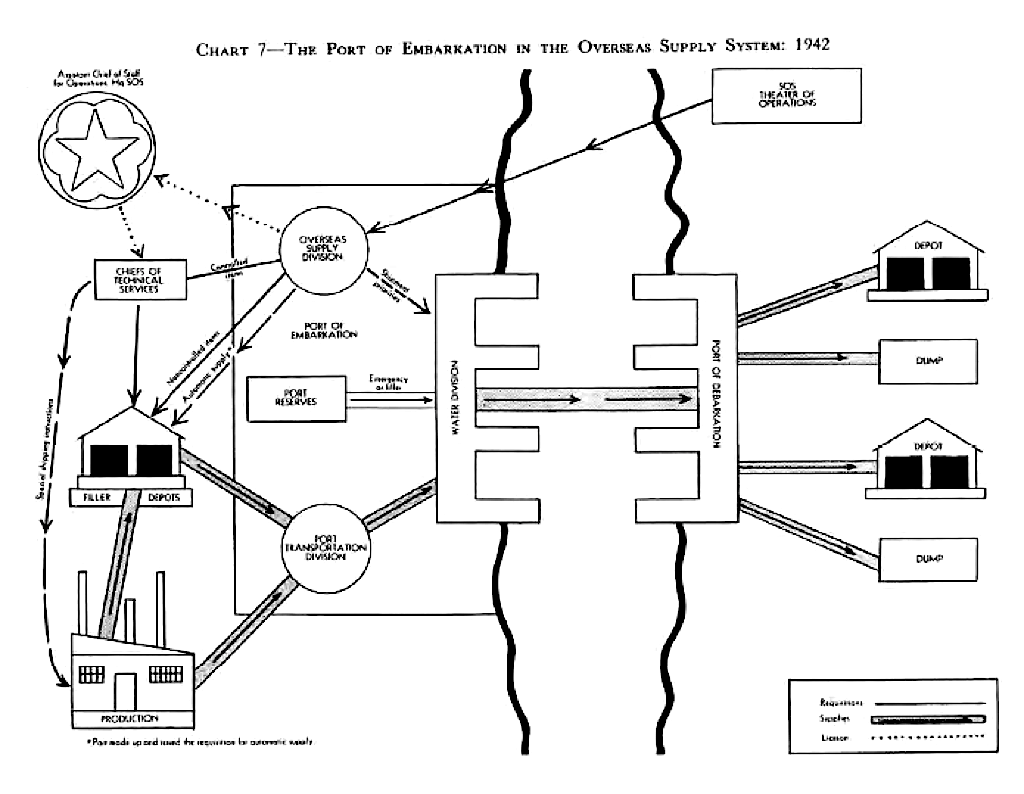
The Port of Embarkation in the Overseas Supply System: 1942.

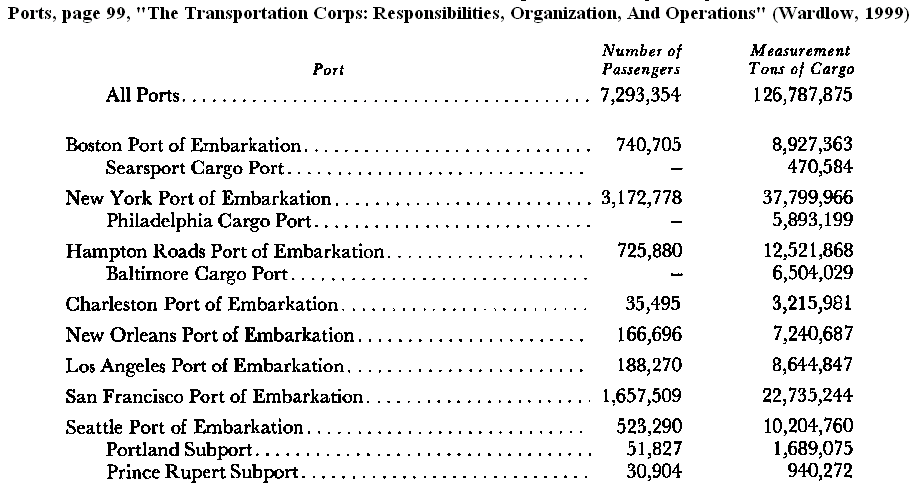
Army ports: Passengers and tons of cargo embarked during the period December 1941 – August 1945.

The Boston Port of Embarkation (BPOE) was a United States Army command responsible for the movement of troops and supplies from the United States to overseas commands. In World War I it was a sub-port of the New York Port of Embarkation. During World War II it became an independent Port of Embarkation with the second greatest number of passengers embarked and third greatest tonnage of cargo embarked by east coast Ports of Embarkation. In passengers it was exceeded on the east coast only by New York and in cargo only by New York and the Hampton Roads Port of Embarkation. Within three months after entry of the United States into World War II Boston was being established as a sub-port of New York. (Note: During the period the New York sub-port at Charleston became the independent Charleston Port of Embarkation and the San Francisco Port of Embarkation sub-port at Seattle became the independent Seattle Port of Embarkation. Sub-ports of San Francisco were being established at Portland, Oregon and Los Angeles, California.) With establishment of the United States Army Transportation Corps in March 1942 the Boston sub-port became the independent Boston Port of Embarkation.

The Boston Army Base, preexisting the establishment of the POE, was a major component of the port. The cargo only sub-port at Searsport, Maine was a sub-port of the Boston POE specializing in ammunition and explosives. Camp Myles Standish, a component of the Boston POE, was the main staging area for troops. Other facilities under the command included Camp Curtis Guild, Camp McKay and the Maynard Ammunition Storage Depot.

== History ==
Boston was a sub-port of the World War I era New York Port of Embarkation. After that war the ports had eventually been disestablished to become U.S. Army Quartermaster Corps facilities. The New York POE was disestablished on 24 April 1920 and reestablished 6 May 1932. When war began in Europe in 1939 New York had already been reestablished as a POE with sub ports, including Boston, being established within three months of the entry of the United States into World War II. The port commands were broadly given responsibility for specific theaters of the war with Boston focused on the North Atlantic and northern Europe. Newfoundland, Labrador, Greenland, and Iceland were supported by the Boston port but the heaviest cargo tonnage were shipments to northern Europe.

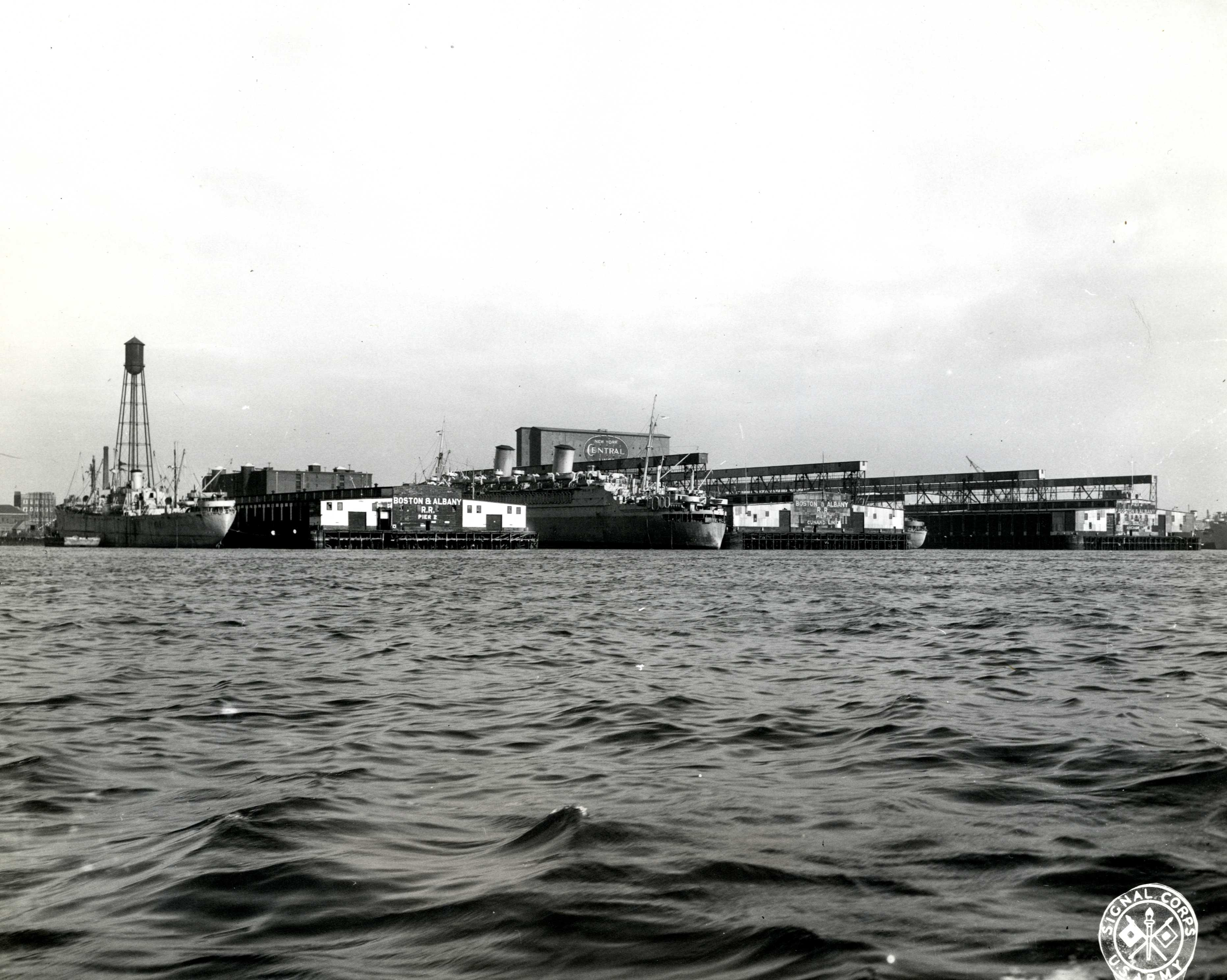
Liberty and Troop Ships at Boston Port of Embarkation, Boston Piers in East Boston.

In a major reorganization of March 1942 the transportation responsibilities of the Quartermaster Corps, including the ocean shipping function of the Army Transport Service and Army port operations, were transferred to the new Transportation Corps. The Boston sub-port became an independent Port of Embarkation under the Transportation Corps in July 1942 using both Army owned and leased port facilities. (Note: The Hampton Roads Port of Embarkation was also established at that time.) Sub-ports of Boston were established at Providence, Rhode Island (brief operation early in the war), Searsport (ammunition and explosives), Maine and at Halifax, Nova Scotia, Quebec City and Montreal in Canada. After incidents involving ship damage in over crowded New York harbor where all Atlantic convoys were being assembled for their escorts the Joint Chiefs of Staff authorized Army transports from Boston to assemble at Halifax to join the Atlantic convoy. (Note: For the same reason slow shipping destined for North Africa was shifted to the Hampton Roads POE.)

The passengers embarked at Boston Port of Embarkation between December 1941 and December 1945 totaled 768,898 with none in 1941, 26,747 in 1942, 116,476 in 1943, 456,651 in 1944 and 169,024 in 1945. Cargo, in measurement tons of 40 cu ft (1.1 m^{3}), for the same period was a total of 9,481,780 with 160 in December 1941 then 600,612 in 1942, 1,959,969 in 1943, 3,953,680 in 1944 and 2,967,359 for 1945. Ammunition, excluding that for small arms, and high explosives shipped from the Boston Port of Embarkation totaled 457,626 short tons out of Boston and 435,573 out of Searsport.

As of 31 December 1944 the Boston Port of Embarkation employed 12,558 people of which 4,881 were military, 4,570 civilian and 3,107 other workers that included contractors, Italian Service Units and German prisoners of war. Its Searsport sub-port employed 850 people of which 186 were military, 128 civilian and 536 other workers.

Boston handled 10.7% of the returning troops during the period 1945-1946 with 74,185 arriving in December 1945 and 679,196 over the full period. (Note: Comparable figures for other major ports are of the total 6,376,287 for all ports 2,628,919 returned through the New York POE, 684,270 at Hampton Roads POE and on the west coast 1,120,766 at San Francisco POE and 642,539 st Seattle.)

== Functions ==
The days immediately after the Pearl Harbor attack congestion and backlogs at the ports had demonstrated the necessity for port control of incoming shipments of troops and cargo. The commanding officers of the ports of embarkation, port commanders, exercised control far beyond the bounds of the ports themselves as only the ports had full information regarding both capacities at the port for troops and supplies, ship loading and capacity and exact sailing information. The port commander controlled movements from points of origin to the port for both troops and supplies giving detailed instructions on preparation of troops before departure from points of origin as the port was required to finish both training and equipping before sailing. To prevent port congestion and conflict between the Army shipping and Lend Lease shipping, which was handled commercially, a port agency was established in Boston during October 1941. That agency coordinated with the Traffic Control Division in the Office of the Chief of Transportation. Late in the war, to better coordinate usage of shipping by Army and Navy joint Army-Navy Shipping Information Agencies (ANSIA) were established with one at Boston.

For troops, the originating location would receive movement orders about five days prior to transport with details of the destination and time of arrival. Those were often adjusted based on factors at the port, including ship schedules. While aboard trains destined for the port the troops were under the command of the port commander's representative. Movement orders for the troops' equipment were sent in advance of the troop movement orders due to the longer time in shipment. The port's embarkation camps thus had facilities ranging from hospitals to firing ranges. The camps were under the direct command of the Port Commander with responsibility to complete final training, equipping and other preparation of troops in coordination with troopship and convoy schedules. After the war ended in Europe special the ports implemented special steps in the staging areas to separate troops arriving for discharge and those being shipped to the Pacific so that the completely different type of processing required could be done efficiently.

The POE Command extended to the troops and cargo embarked on ships until they were disembarked overseas through "transport commanders" and "cargo security officers" appointed and under the command of the POE aboard all troop and cargo ships under Army control, either owned, bareboat chartered and operated or charter with operation by War Shipping Administration (WSA) agents. Troops embarked aboard all vessels except U.S. Naval transports remained under overall command of the port commander until disembarked overseas. That command was exercised by the Transport Commander whose responsibilities extended to all passengers and cargo but did not extend to operation of the ship which remained with the ship's master. On large troop ships the transport command included a permanent staff of administration, commissary, medical and chaplain personnel. The cargo security officers were representatives of the port commander aboard ships only transporting Army cargo.

A particular function of the fully evolved Port of Embarkation was the regulation of traffic from point of origin to destination for efficiency and in order to prevent congestion at the port and promote the best use of scarce shipping. An early example at Boston was difficulty with development in Greenland in 1941, before U.S. entry into the war, and early 1942. No regular shipping company maintained a line to Greenland and the U.S. Army Corps of Engineers was responsible for constructing bases. The Corps maintained a facility for assembly, storage and shipping those supplies and equipment in New Jersey. As a result ships arrived at Boston from New York so loaded with Engineer material that nothing else could be shipped. The Greenland Base Command simultaneously reported its supply situation unsatisfactory with regard to maintenance and operation supply. In June-July 1942 a meeting between the commands involved resolved the problem by making the Boston Port of Embarkation responsible for allocating shipping according to priorities of the Greenland Base Command and the Engineers transferred the activity from New Jersey to Boston. The supply situation was resolved by mid December 1942.

One of the more unusual and difficult shipments from the port was one in which a small detachment along with arctic equipment, housing, fuel and weather and communications equipment shipped in support of each of the CRYSTAL weather stations. Those stations were to support the Crimson air ferry route to Britain and were designated Crystal I at Fort Chimo, Labrador, Crystal II at the upper end of Frobisher Bay and Crystal III off the northeast coast of Baffin Island (See Paallavvik for description of establishing the site.). The initial transport was aboard USAT Sicilien but due to local conditions smaller vessels had to be used for the final portion. (Note: Sicilien was a 1,654 GRT Danish motor ship built in 1938 seized by the U.S. in 1941. The ship was turned over to the Army for operation with Army crew. The ship was torpedoed in June 1942 with the loss of 46 of the 77 people aboard.)

== Facilities ==
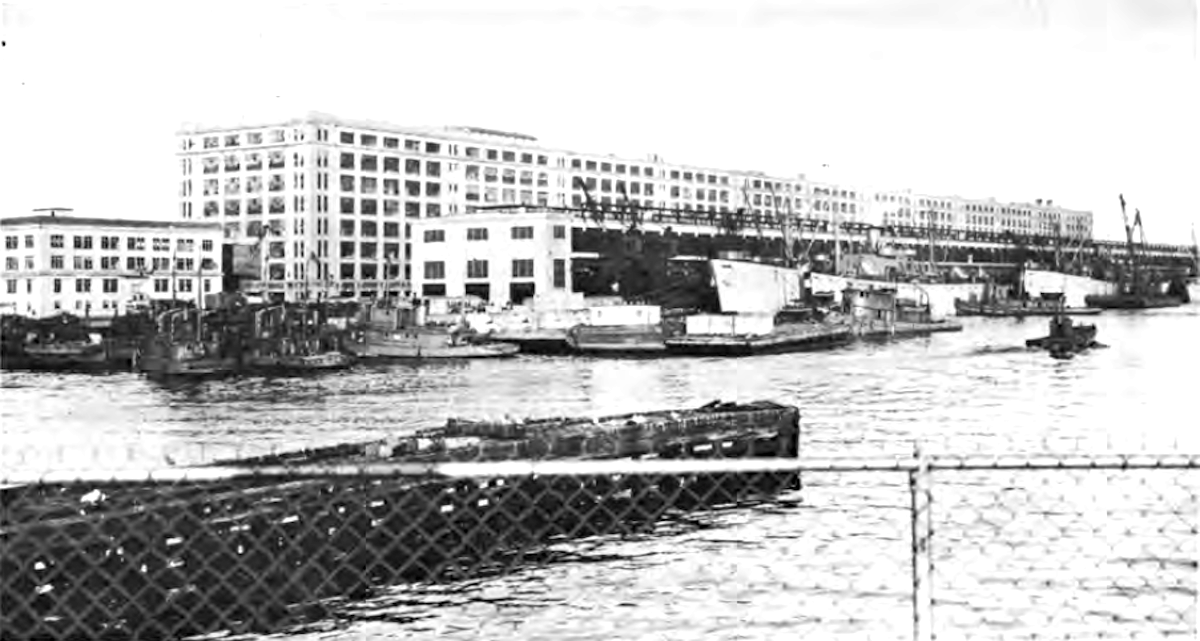
Reactivated World War I Army installation, Boston Port of Embarkation.

At the beginning of the war the existing Boston Army Base, completed October 1918 and previously the Boston Quartermaster Terminal, was converted to function within a port of embarkation by removing the Quartermaster Depot functions that supported operations other than transshipment. The port operated special Army piers and storage facilities for ammunition and explosives with berths for seven ships at Castle Island in Boston harbor. The location was less than ideal and resulted in limitations being placed on ammunition loading. The Searsport sub-port, with a leased railway pier and focused on ammunition and explosives, was developed to relieve Castle Island.

Troops leaving Camp Myles Standish for the Boston Port of Embarkation.

Camp Miles Standish was the port's main staging area with a capacity for 23,400 troops. Others included Camp Curtis Guild, Camp McKay, the Maynard Ammunition Storage Depot and other staging areas in Massachusetts.

To connect the installations within the area the ports used large numbers of small vessels. On 1 August 1945 the Boston POE had 125 such vessels.

== See also ==
- New York Port of Embarkation (NYPOE)
- San Francisco Port of Embarkation (SFPOE)
- Hampton Roads Port of Embarkation
- Seattle Port of Embarkation
- New Orleans Port of Embarkation
- Charleston Port of Embarkation (CPOE)
- Los Angeles Port of Embarkation

== Bibliography ==
- Bykofsky, Joseph; Larson, Harold (1990). The Technical Services—The Transportation Corps: Operations Overseas (PDF). United States Army In World War II. Washington, DC: Center Of Military History, United States Army. LCCN 56060000. Archived from the original (PDF) on 27 September 2012.
- Clay, Steven E. (2011). U. S. Army Order Of Battle 1919–1941 (PDF). Volume 4. The Services: Quartermaster, Medical, Military Police, Signal Corps, Chemical Warfare, And Miscellaneous Organizations, 1919–41. Vol. 4. Fort Leavenworth, KS: Combat Studies Institute Press. ISBN 9780984190140. LCCN 2010022326.
- Huston, James A. (1966). The Sinews of War: Army Logistics 1775–1953. Army Historical Series. Washington, DC: Center Of Military History, United States Army. p. 346. ISBN 9780160899140. LCCN 66060015.
- National Archives and Records Administration (Summer 1993). "National Archives". Transfers from the National Archives, Washington, D.C. Area — News from the Archives (Summer 1993). Washington, D.C.: United States. National Archives and Records Administration.
- Wardlow, Chester (1956). The Technical Services—The Transportation Corps: Movements, Training, And Supply. United States Army In World War II. Washington, DC: Center Of Military History, United States Army. LCCN 55060003. Archived from the original on 31 October 2011.
- Wardlow, Chester (1999). The Technical Services—The Transportation Corps: Responsibilities, Organization, And Operations. United States Army In World War II. Washington, DC: Center Of Military History, United States Army. LCCN 99490905. Archived from the original on 31 October 2011.
- War Department (1944). FM55-10 Water Transportation: Oceangoing Vessels (PDF). War Department Field Manual. Washington, DC: United States Department of War.
- World War I Group, Historical Division, Special Staff, U.S. Army (1931). Zone of the Interior: Territorial Departments Tactical Divisions Organized in 1918 Posts, Camps, and Stations (PDF). Order of Battle of the United States Land Forces in the World War. Vol. 3 pt. 2. Washington, D.C.: Center of Military History, U.S. Army. LCCN 31027280. Archived from the original (PDF) on 4 March 2016.
