= Charleston Port of Embarkation =

US Army port of Embarkation during World War II

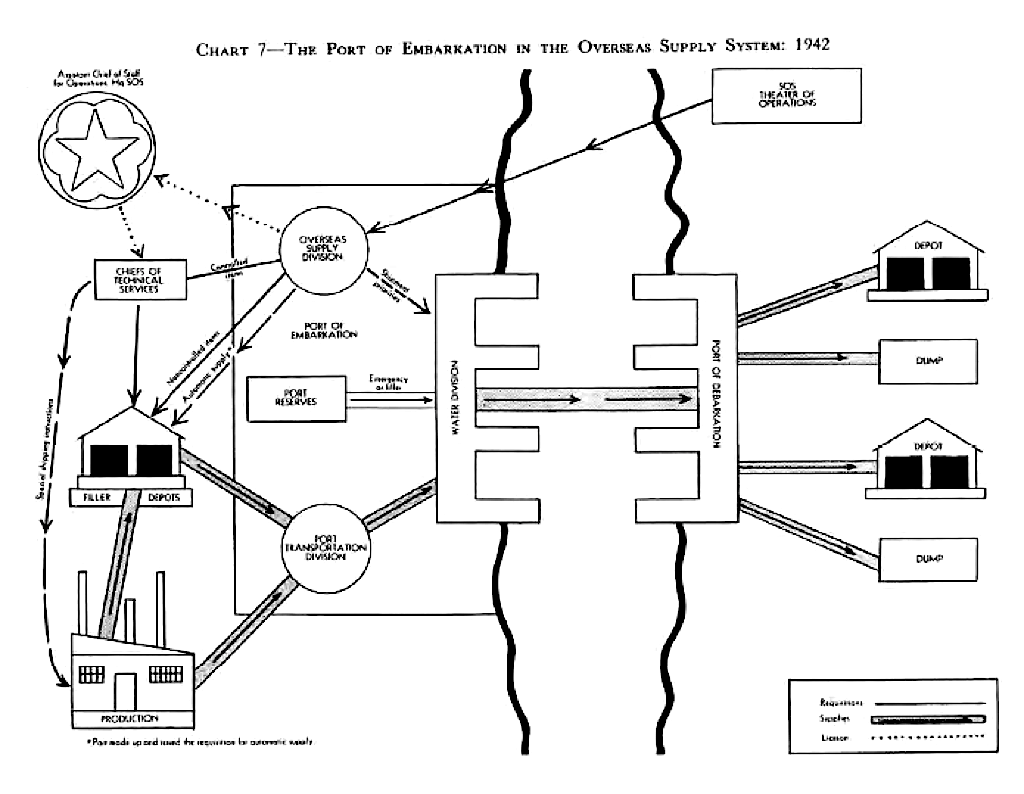
The Port of Embarkation in the Overseas Supply System: 1942.

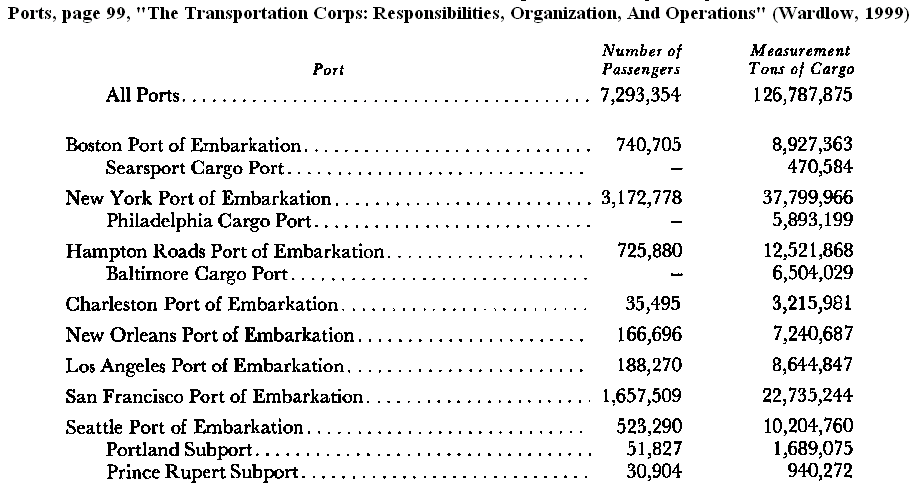
Army ports: Passengers and tons of cargo embarked during the period December 1941 – August 1945.

The Charleston Port of Embarkation (CPOE) was a United States Army Port of Embarkation (POE) responsible for the movement of troops and supplies from the United States to overseas commands. The CPOE was established in Charleston to relieve pressure on the New York Port of Embarkation with initial responsibility largely centered on the West Indies and Caribbean. After the United States entered World War II, Charleston became a POE in its own right. Later in the war, more use was made of the Port, and it was designated as the home port for Army hospital ships serving the European and Mediterranean theaters. In the spring of 1943 the Chief of Transportation began to train personnel for the operation and maintenance of small boats and amphibian trucks there, before they were moved to Camp Gordon Johnston. The CPOE also served as a training place for army beach landings.

James E. Slack and James T. Duke commanded the port. Originally the Charleston Ordnance Depot, it was redesigned the Charleston Port of Embarkation during World War II. On July 1, 1952, it officially became the Charleston Transportation Corps Marine Depot. Although the facilities for shipping medical supplies from Charleston, South Carolina, were not complete until after the war's end, the first three hospital ships were assigned to the port on November 1, 1943: The USAHS Acadia, the USAHS Seminole, and USAHS Shamrock. The port also trained the first Harbor Craft Companies. From December 1941 to August 1945, the port carried 35,495 people, and 3,215,981 pounds of supplies. At the peak of the war, 21 of 26 hospital ships were assigned to the CPOE.

== See also ==
- New York Port of Embarkation (NYPOE)
- San Francisco Port of Embarkation (SFPOE)
- Hampton Roads Port of Embarkation
- Seattle Port of Embarkation
- Boston Port of Embarkation (BPOE)
- New Orleans Port of Embarkation
- Los Angeles Port of Embarkation

== Sources ==
- Gillett, Mary C. (2009). The Army Medical Department 1917—1941. Army Historical Series. Washington, DC: Center Of Military History, United States Army. LCCN 2008053316. Archived from the original on 28 October 2014.
- Leighton, Richard M.; Coakley, Robert W. (1955). Global Logistics and Strategy: 1940-1943. Government Printing Office.
- Larson, Harold (1944). Army hospital ships in World War II.
- Report of the chief of transportation, Army service forces, world war II. Washington, D.C., War dept.: United States Army Service Forces. Office of the Chief of Transportation. 1945.
- Smith, Clarence McKittrick (1956). The Technical Services—The Medical Department: Hospitalization And Evacuation, Zone Of Interior (PDF). United States Army In World War II. Washington, DC: Center Of Military History, United States Army. LCCN 55060005. Archived from the original (PDF) on September 27, 2012.
- Wardlow, Chester (1999). The Technical Services—The Transportation Corps: Responsibilities, Organization, And Operations. United States Army In World War II. Washington, DC: Center Of Military History, United States Army. LCCN 99490905. Archived from the original on 25 January 2014.
