= San Francisco Port of Embarkation =

Former United States Army command

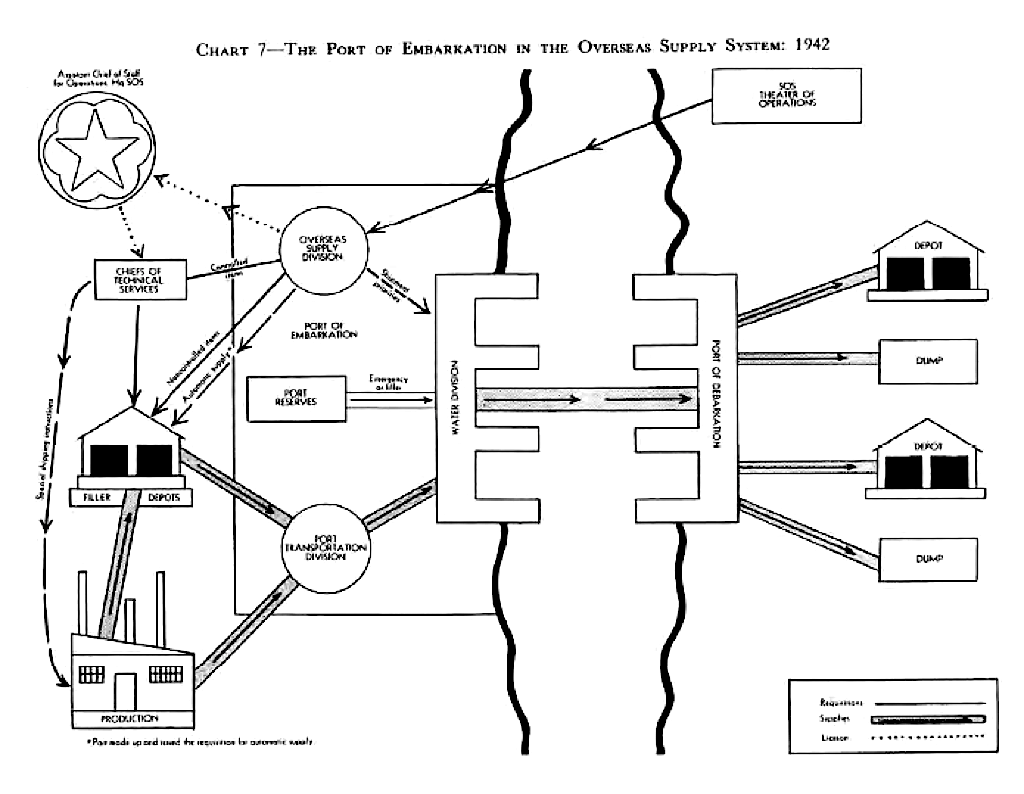
The Port of Embarkation in the Overseas Supply System, 1942

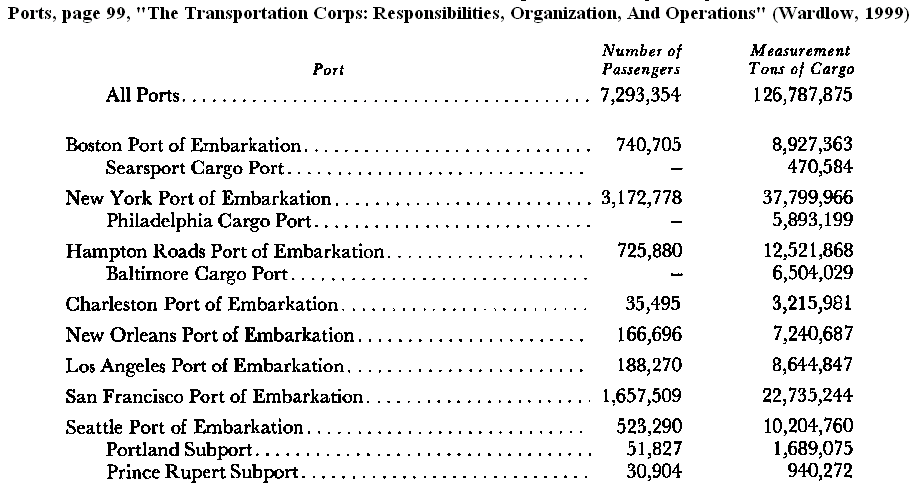
Army ports: Passengers and tons of cargo embarked during the period December 1941 – August 1945.

The San Francisco Port of Embarkation (SFPOE) was a United States Army command responsible for movement of supplies and troops to and from the Pacific during World War II with extensive facilities in the San Francisco area. SFPOE was established 6 May 1932 and disestablished 1 October 1955. It was originally composed of the long term Pacific terminal at Fort Mason that had been the home port and terminal for the Pacific Army Transport Service ships. That facility was far too limited to serve the requirements of a full port of embarkation. In 1940 the port began expansion to include Army owned and leased facilities throughout the San Francisco Bay area and for a time sub ports at Seattle and Los Angeles. Those eventually became separate commands as the Seattle Port of Embarkation and Los Angeles Port of Embarkation.

Sea transportation was a responsibility of the United States Army Quartermaster Corps but World War II requirements showed weakness in the corps' transportation role. The Army reorganized in March 1942 creating a Transportation Division under the United States Army Services of Supply with a Chief of Transportation. In July the U.S. Army Transportation Corps took over surface transport responsibilities including the ports of embarkation.

The San Francisco Port of Embarkation, established in 1932, was the second largest POE after the New York Port of Embarkation (NYPOE) which had existed in World War I and was the model for such commands and facilities. An Army Port of Embarkation involved far more than a marine terminal. Under the command of the port were subsidiary Army camps, large rail and storage facilities, and local transportation networks. The Fort Mason facilities were far too limited to support the marine logistics required for war in the Pacific and were quickly supplemented.

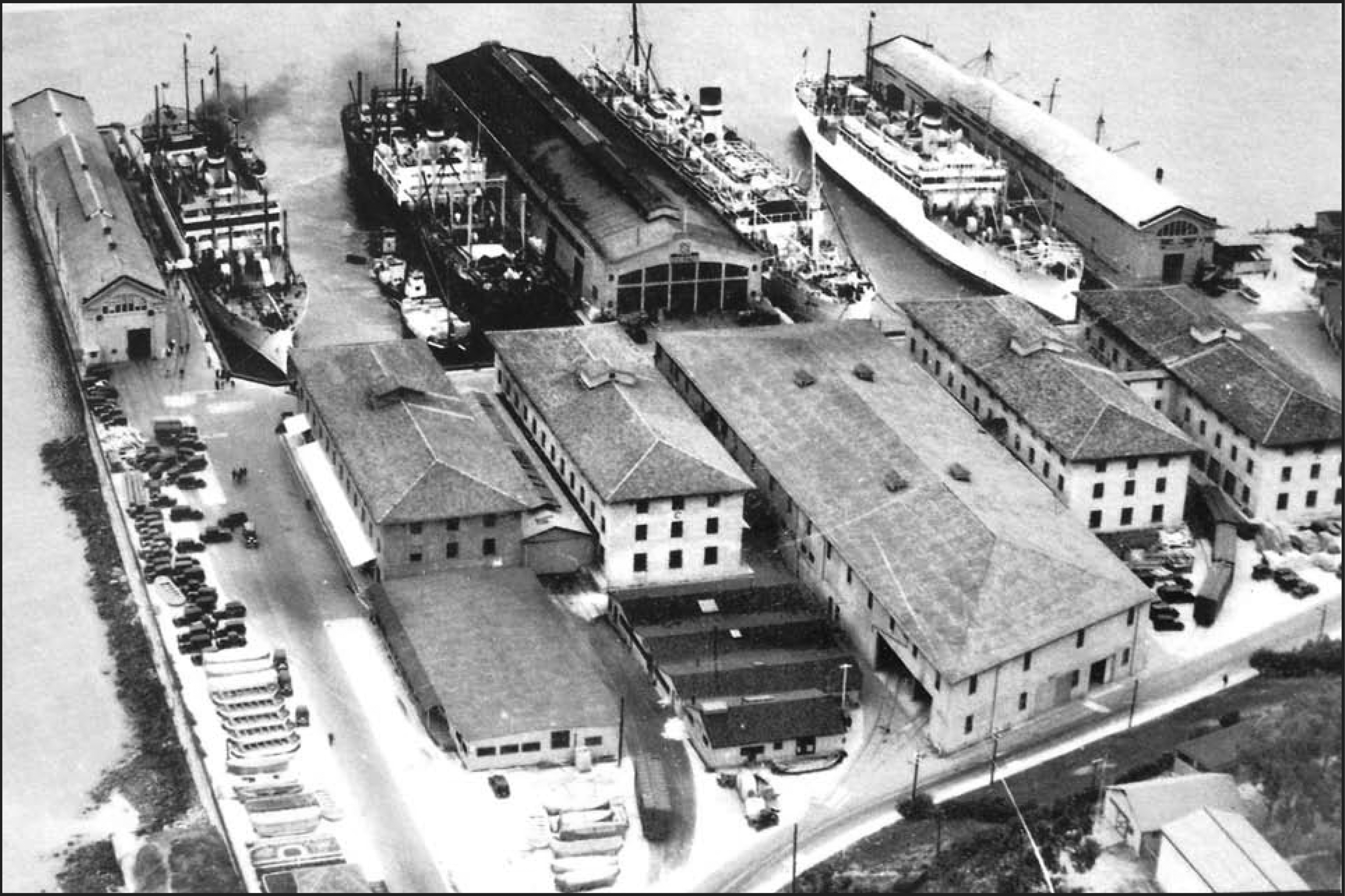
U.S. Army transports berthed at the U.S. Army Transport Service docks at Fort Mason, CA, about 1929

The Oakland Army Base, a facility of the San Francisco Port of Embarkation

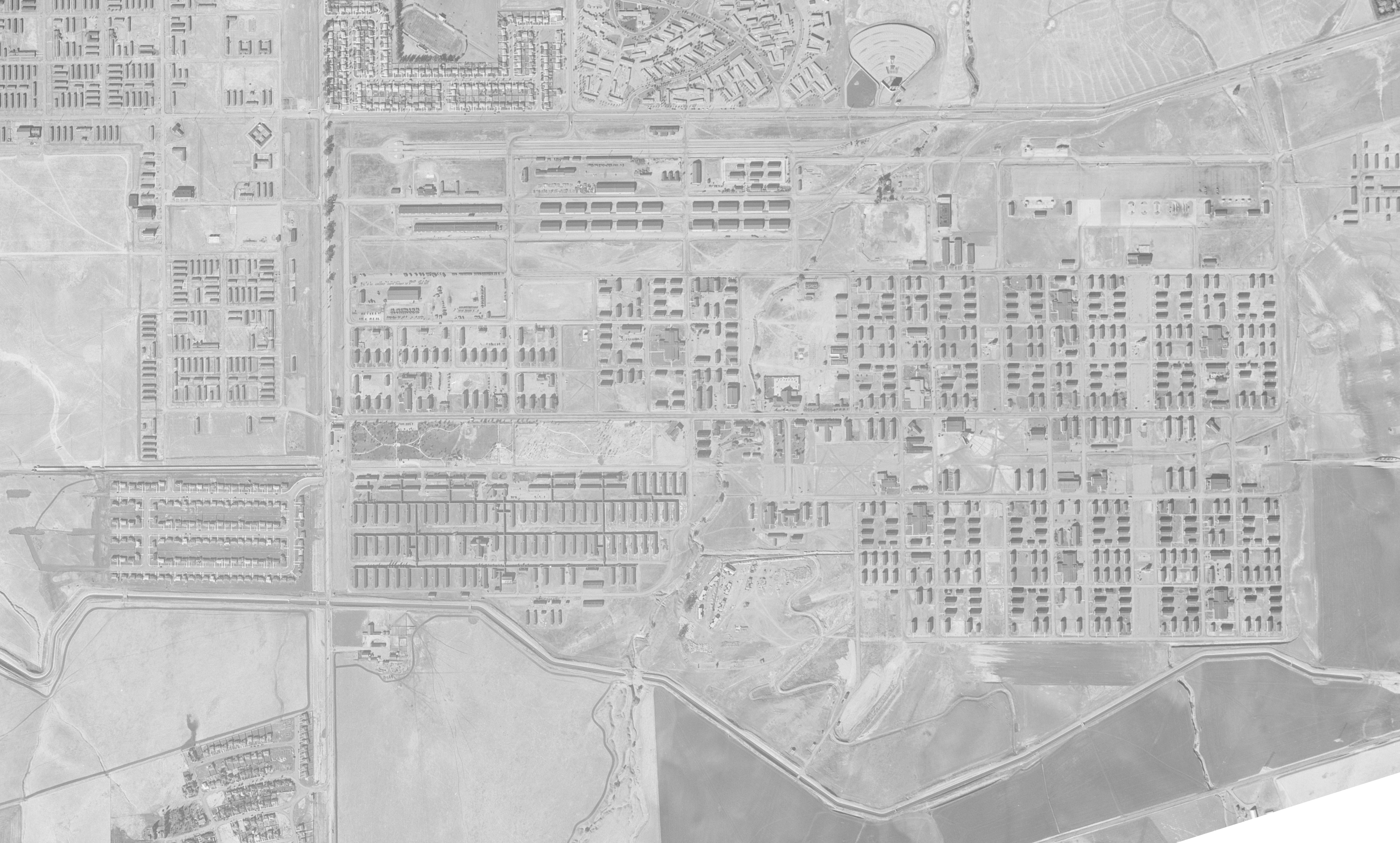
Camp Stoneman October 11, 1947

Eventually thirteen facilities, beyond the headquarters and old port at Fort Mason, composed the San Francisco Port of Embarkation. Leased piers and warehouses could not support such a port and by January 1941 a large Army owned facility was being constructed in Oakland to be commissioned in December 1941 as the Oakland sub port and later the Oakland Army Base. To serve as a staging area for troops Camp Stoneman, processing over a million troops in World War II and 1,500,000 including the Korean War, was constructed. Those were connected by transportation networks, both commercial and Army owned, to feed the overseas transportation. One of the divisions, the Water Division, crewed, maintained, and converted the Army ocean transports based in the Pacific.

The command also managed troop and freight movements from their origin to their destination. Troop and freight trains destined for the port moved only under orders of the port commander. The ships, under the port until reaching their destination, had representatives of the port commander aboard. Troop ships had a Transport Commander, with overall command of all embarked personnel but ship's crew, as representative of the port commander.

The command was disestablished 1 October 1955.

== History ==
The U.S. Army had based its Pacific marine transportation at Fort Mason in San Francisco since before World War I. The port facility served as the home port for the Army Transport Service ships serving Alaska, Hawaii, the Philippines and other Army posts of the Pacific. Those areas were not greatly involved in World War I and the port had not been greatly expanded or organized in the manner of the Hoboken Port of Embarkation that had expanded into the New York Port of Embarkation (NYPOE) that was reactivated as the United States approached entry into World War II. The NYPOE was the model for an Army command and facilities structure capable of sustaining massive overseas transport and extended far beyond a specific location such as Fort Mason. An Army Port of Embarkation spanned port facilities that were requisitioned or leased with the addition of camps, rail heads, and entire transportation networks feeding the port operations and even sub Ports of Embarkation in other port cities.

The ports were then under the United States Army Quartermaster Corps. Weakness in supervision of the transport functions resulted in a reorganization which in March 1942 created a Transportation Division under the United States Army Services of Supply under which a Chief of Transportation was established. On 31 July 1942 the U.S. Army Transportation Corps was formed with responsibility for surface transport to include the ports of embarkation.

Between the wars the Army began applying some of the concepts of the First World War POE to the Brooklyn Army Base and Fort Mason. The San Francisco Port of Embarkation was established 6 May 1932 with headquarters at Fort Mason assuming command over the Army Transport Service, the San Francisco General Quartermaster Depot at Fort Mason and the Overseas Replacement and Discharge Service at Fort McDowell, California. In 1939 when war began in Europe New York was already operating as a POE with sub ports established after 1939. On the Pacific only the port at San Francisco was operating in 1939.

The Army realized the relatively small port facility at Fort Mason was inadequate for supporting major wartime operations in the Pacific and began major expansion. In early 1941 the Army acquired property in Oakland and Seattle. The Oakland port facility, 624.5 acres (2.527 km^{2}) at the terminus for the transcontinental railroads, was an integral part of the San Francisco POE. Seattle was established as a sub port in August 1941 relieving San Francisco of its historic role in Alaskan supply. Seattle would later develop to include its own sub-ports, including an important one at the terminus of the Canadian National Railway at Prince Rupert, British Columbia, and become an independent port of embarkation in January 1942. A sub port was developed at Portland, Oregon operating under SFPOE until transferred in November 1944 to the Seattle POE. Los Angeles was established as a sub-port of the San Francisco Port of Embarkation on 24 January 1942 serving that role until becoming the independent Los Angeles Port of Embarkation 1 May 1943.

The 1945 organization followed the Office of the Chief of Transportation's standard structure of Commanding General's Office, General Staff, Operating Divisions, Administrative Services, Technical Services, and Special Commands consisting of from 10 to 7,000 persons in each group. The Overseas Supply Division, under the General Staff, was composed of a military and civilian staff of 1,134 managed the port's outgoing shipments. It received requisitions, ensured they met War Department policies, considered operational concerns, prioritized shipping and arranged shipment with the operational divisions. The Transportation Division arranged movements within the port from points of arrival to the docks or to holding points. The Water Division, which grew from the autonomous Army Transport Service, loaded, crewed, repaired, and converted ships that ranged from small craft to converting large transports. The Water, Transportation and Postal Divisions had 11,121 military and civilian personnel assigned in 1945.

Though the Army lost its ocean transport role with the creation of the Department of Defense and its ships were transferred to the Military Sea Transportation Service in 1950 the port continued operations through the Korean War until disestablished in October 1955.

== Functions ==
The commanding officers of the ports of embarkation, port commanders, exercised control far beyond the bounds of the ports themselves. Due to the fact that only the ports had full information regarding both capacities at the port for troops and supplies, ship loading and capacity and exact sailing information they controlled movements from points of origin to the port for both troops and supplies. The port commanders gave detailed instructions on preparation of troops before departure from points of origin as the port was required to finish both training and equipping before sailing. For troops, the originating location would receive movement orders about five days prior to transport with details of the destination and time of arrival. Those were often adjusted based on factors at the port, including ship schedules. While aboard trains destined for the port the troops were under the command of the port commander's representative. Movement orders for the troops' equipment were sent in advance of the troop movement orders due to the longer time in shipment.

The days immediately after the Pearl Harbor attack had demonstrated the necessity for port control of incoming shipments of troops and cargo. San Francisco had been swamped by troops and freight with arrivals much greater than the possibility of shipping out. On one day, 12 January 1942, 3,208 loaded rail cars had arrived. Backlog threatened to clog the port beyond its limits and an embargo on shipments to the port was necessary. The port's movement control was effective with a capacity for 2,500 freight cars per day five months later. A reverse of the incoming backlog was a problem with shipping held at the destination due to both requisitions beyond needs and holding ships at the destination as floating warehouses, often due to the poor port facilities at the destination. As an example, at Leyte 66 loaded ships were anchored in port with 78 more on the way.

The POE Command extended to the troops and cargo embarked on ships until they were disembarked overseas through "transport commanders" and "cargo security officers" appointed and under the command of the POE aboard all troop and cargo ships under Army control, either owned, bareboat chartered and operated or charter with operation by War Shipping Administration (WSA) agents. Troops embarked aboard all vessels except U.S. Naval transports remained under overall command of the port commander until disembarked overseas. That command was exercised by the Transport Commander whose responsibilities extended to all passengers and cargo but did not extend to operation of the ship which remained with the ship's master. On large troop ships the transport command included a permanent staff of administration, commissary, medical and chaplain personnel. The cargo security officers were representatives of the port commander aboard ships only transporting Army cargo.

== Facilities ==
Thirteen installations in the San Francisco area beyond Fort Mason were part of the San Francisco POE. The port used 20 piers with 43 berths for oceangoing ships and had 2,867,000 sq ft (266,353.0 m^{2}) of warehouse space, 1,984,000 sq ft (184,319.6 m^{2}) transit shed space and 7,640,000 sq ft (709,779.2 m^{2}) of open space. The port had accommodation space for 34,338 persons in its staging areas to include both transit troops and station personnel.

Other facilities included the piers at Alameda, the Richmond Parr Terminals, an Air Force depot, the Emeryville Ordnance Shops, Hamilton Field for air shipments and the Presidio which included an animal depot. The Stockton Piers and the Humboldt Bay Piers were more distant elements of the port. The Emeryville Motor Depot was created with parking lots, rail facilities and a large building specifically to be a centralized facility receiving all vehicles at one location where they could be inspected, repaired if necessary and prepared for overseas shipment. The facility was notable for its efficiency and between December 1941 and August 1945 the facility processed 100,054 and shipped out 99,731 tanks, tractors, trucks, and other vehicles.

Troop staging areas included the Army camps for housing, final training and equipping the troops with equipment to be carried with them aboard transports. The troops generally arrived by train, were processed and given final training, including conduct aboard transports and abandon ship training, inspected for equipment and finally alerted and transported to the piers for boarding overseas transports on a schedule before sailing. (Note: Ferries were used for water transport directly to the piers. See the photo of SS Catalina transporting returning troops from disembarkation piers to Camp Stoneman.) Shortly after the Pacific war began the press of troops transshipping in the attempt to reinforce the Philippines required vacating the Presidio by the garrison and use by the port as a staging area.

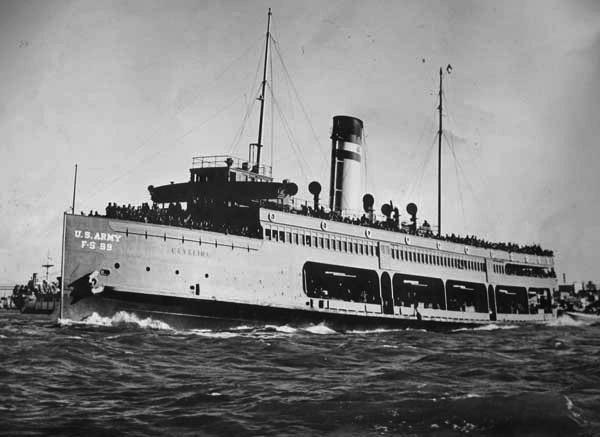
Catalina as U.S. Army FS-99

The staging camps were connected to the terminals and piers in Oakland and San Francisco by water transport. Army harbor boats made routine trips but the main transport for troops was by means of ferries. The well known excursion vessels that served Santa Catalina Island, Catalina and Cabrillo, were drafted into service. Their Army designations were FS-99 and FS-100 respectively. The Oakland-San Francisco ferry Yerba Buena, later renamed Ernie Pyle, also joined the fleet. The trip to piers in San Francisco took three to four hours.

The port's primary staging area and the largest on the west coast, Camp Stoneman at Pittsburg, California, also included the Pacific Coast Transportation Corps Officer Training School. Two rail lines served Pittsburg and the San Joaquin River offered water access. More than a million soldiers processed through the camp. Including operation during the Korean War over 1,500,000 troops were processed through the camp. Processing took four to five days from arrival to departure with units known only by a shipment code number. Late in the war the SFPOE experimented with embarking troops directly aboard a Liberty ship at Camp Stoneman but that was not successful due to difficulties of large ships navigation to the camp.

Fort McDowell on Angel Island was the staging area for unassigned enlisted men termed "casuals" and also served as a prisoner of war facility. The camp's mess hall could seat 1,410 at one time but had to have three seatings for each meal. About 300,000 men processed through Fort McDowell. At the end of the war returning soldiers were processed and sent to troop trains in Oakland and San Francisco.

At war's end the port's function reversed and its facilities became separation centers ensuring rapid processing so soldiers could be sent home. A record may have been set when in one day twenty trains loaded in Oakland and two in San Francisco.

== Operations ==
Over the years of the war, 1,657,509 passengers and 22,735,244 measured tons of cargo moved from the port into the Pacific. This total represents two-thirds of all troops sent into the Pacific and more than one-half of all Army cargo moved through West Coast ports. The highest passenger count was logged in August 1945 when 93,986 outbound passengers were loaded.

The port had its difficulties, in particular when compared to New York. While its operations got good mention from inspectors and visitors an independent trend of its divisions created some difficulties. It also had a specific difficulty compared to the east coast ports. Those shipped to well developed Atlantic ports with ocean distances much shorter than the Pacific. The ports served were often small, undeveloped, even rudimentary.

== Disestablishment ==
On 1 October 1955 the San Francisco Port of Embarkation was disestablished with the Pacific Transportation Terminal Command established at Fort Mason assigned responsibility for all Army terminals and related functions on the Pacific coasts of North and South America.

== See also ==
- New York Port of Embarkation (NYPOE)
- Hampton Roads Port of Embarkation
- Seattle Port of Embarkation
- Boston Port of Embarkation (BPOE)
- New Orleans Port of Embarkation
- Charleston Port of Embarkation (CPOE)
- Los Angeles Port of Embarkation

== Bibliography ==
- Bykofsky, Joseph; Larson, Harold (1990). The Technical Services—The Transportation Corps: Operations Overseas (PDF). United States Army In World War II. Washington, DC: Center Of Military History, United States Army. LCCN 56060000. Archived from the original (PDF) on September 27, 2012.
- Clay, Steven E. (2011). U. S. Army Order Of Battle 1919–1941 (PDF). Volume 4. The Services: Quartermaster, Medical, Military Police, Signal Corps, Chemical Warfare, And Miscellaneous Organizations, 1919–41. Vol. 4. Fort Leavenworth, KS: Combat Studies Institute Press. ISBN 9780984190140. LCCN 2010022326.
- General Orders No. 55 of 28 September 1955 (PDF) (Report). Washington, D.C.: Department of the Army. 28 September 1955.
- Grover, David (1987). US Army Ships and Watercraft of World War II. Annapolis, MD: Naval Institute Press. pp. 75, 78. ISBN 0-87021-766-6. LCCN 87015514.
- "Golden Gate National Recreation Area - The San Francisco Port of Embarkation". National Park Service.
- Johnson, Danny (LTC (Ret)) (10 August 2017). "Camp Stoneman". California State Military Museums, California Military History Online.
- Schaefer, Mason (1998). The San Francisco Port of Embarkation in World War II: A Study in Command and Control (Report). Center of Military History.
- Soennichsen, John (10 August 2017). "Fort McDowell". California State Military Museums, California Military History Online.
- Thompson, Erwin N. (July 8, 1984). National Register of Historic Places Inventory—Nomination Form, San Francisco Port of Embarkation, U.S. Army (PDF) (Report). Denver, Colorado: National Park Service, Denver Service Center.
- Wardlow, Chester (1956). The Technical Services—The Transportation Corps: Movements, Training, And Supply. United States Army In World War II. Washington, DC: Center Of Military History, United States Army. LCCN 55060003. Archived from the original on October 31, 2011.
- Wardlow, Chester (1999). The Technical Services—The Transportation Corps: Responsibilities, Organization, And Operations. United States Army In World War II. Washington, DC: Center Of Military History, United States Army. LCCN 99490905. Archived from the original on October 31, 2011.
- "War Department. Army Service Forces. Office of the Chief of Transportation. Los Angeles Port of Embarkation. 5/1/1943-6/11/1946 — Organization Authority Record". War Department.
- War Department (1944). FM55-10 Water Transportation: Oceangoing Vessels (PDF). War Department Field Manual. Washington, DC: United States Department of War.
