= Hampton Roads Port of Embarkation =

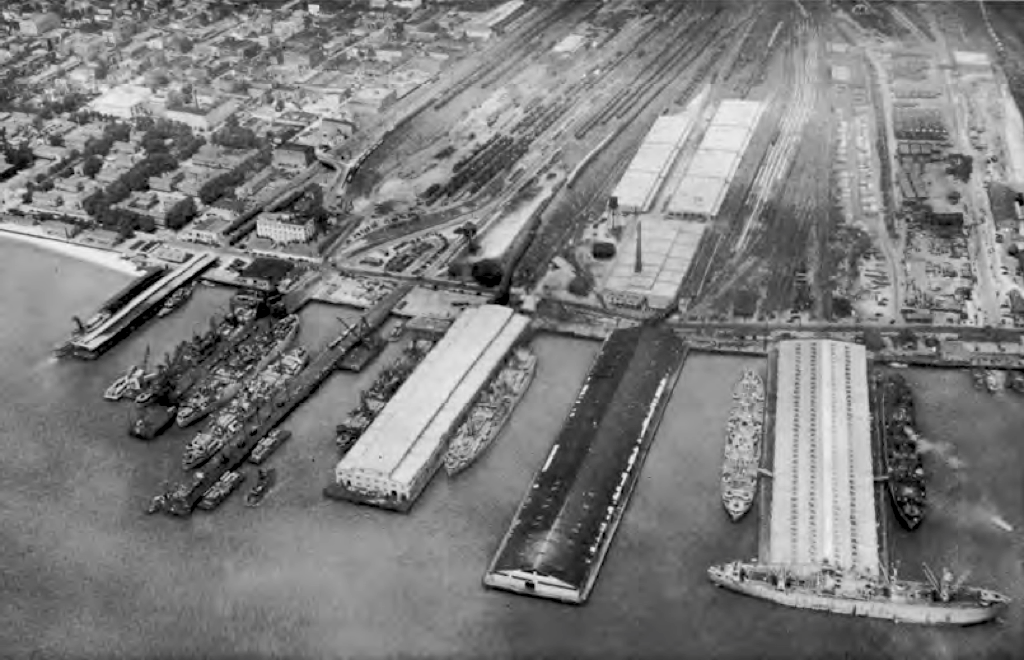
Leased facilities at Newport News, Virginia operated by the Hampton Roads Port of Embarkation.

Hampton Roads Port of Embarkation was the Army command structure and distributed port infrastructure in the Hampton Roads area of Virginia supporting the movement of personnel and cargo overseas. It had been activated as the Newport News Port of Embarkation in World War I, deactivated, then reactivated on 15 June 1942.

== Port of Embarkation concept ==
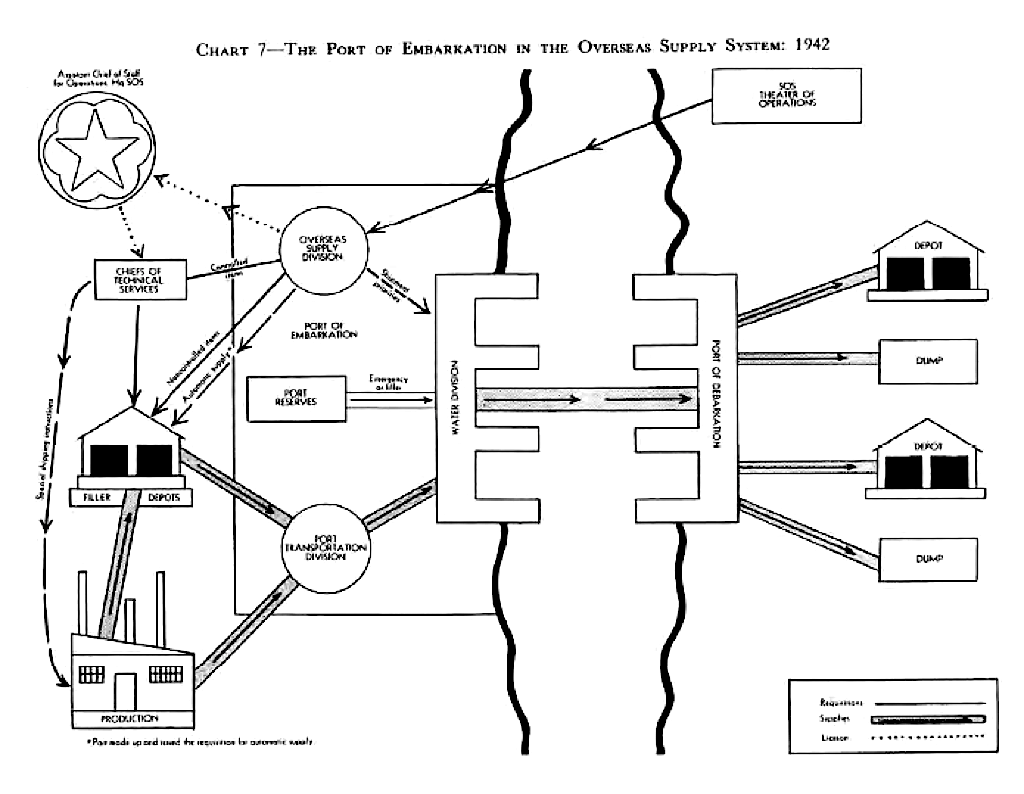
The Port of Embarkation in the Overseas Supply System: 1942.

An Army POE was a command structure and interconnected land transportation, supply and troop housing complex devoted to efficiently loading overseas transports. The scope of the World War II POE is summarized in Army Regulations: AR 55–75, par. 2B, 1 June 1944:

"The commanding officer of a port of embarkation will be responsible for and will have authority over all activities at the port, the reception, supply, transportation, embarkation, and debarkation of troops, and the receipt, storage, and transportation of supplies. He will see that the ships furnished him are properly fitted out for the purpose for which they are intended; he will supervise the operation and maintenance of military traffic between his port and the oversea base or bases; he will command all troops assigned to the port and its component parts, including troops being staged, and will be responsible for the efficient and economical direction of their operations. He will be responsible for the furnishing of necessary instructions to individuals and organizations embarked or debarked at the port . . . He will be responsible for taking the necessary measures to insure the smooth and orderly flow of troops and supplies through the port." (AR 55-75, par. 2B, 1 Jun 44. Quoted Chester Wardlow : pages 95—96, The Transportation Corps: Responsibilities, Organization, and Operations) (Note: Army FM55-10 referenced below includes a graphic illustration of the extent and components of a typical POE on pages 14 and 15.)

Any primary POE could have sub ports and cargo ports even in other cities or temporarily assigned for movements between the United States to one of the overseas commands it normally served.

For troop movements the most critical timing factor was availability of the transports and sailing dates so that the most effective means of minimizing delays at the port was for the POE to control the movement of troops from their home stations to the port as well as having responsibility for ensuring troops were properly equipped and prepared for overseas deployment. Most troops were embarked destined for arrival at rear area assembly points, but when destined for landing against hostile forces the ports "combat loaded" troops under different procedures made in consultation with the force commander that included billeting combat teams together at the port and loading team equipment and supplies aboard the assault vessels for efficient unloading.

In one respect the POE Command extended even to the troops and cargo embarked on ships until they were disembarked overseas through "transport commanders" and "cargo security officers" aboard all troop and cargo ships under Army control, either owned, bareboat chartered and operated or charter with operation by WSA agents that were appointed and under the command of the POE. Troops embarked aboard all vessels except U.S. Naval transports remained under overall command of the port commander until disembarked overseas. That command was exercised by the Transport Commander whose responsibilities extended to all passengers and cargo but did not extend to operation of the ship which remained with the ship's master. On large troop ships the transport command included a permanent staff of administration, commissary, medical and chaplain personnel. The cargo security officers were representatives of the port commander aboard ships only transporting Army cargo.

== World War I ==
Two ports of embarkation were established with commanders appointed 17 July 1917, one at New York with headquarters at Hoboken and the second, then officially the Newport News Port of Embarkation, in Hampton Roads with headquarters at Newport News. While 88% of troops, 1,656,000 from New York itself and 142,000 from its sub-ports, sent overseas transited through the New York Port of Embarkation, 288,000 transited through the Newport News Port of Embarkation.

=== Creation Of Camps ===
The US government had several leases and purchasing agreements with the old dominion land company and would utilize it to establish military training camps connected to the port. Four camps were to be created and would be named Camp Stuart, Camp Alexander, Camp Hill, and Camp Morrison All of them had some distinctions, but in the end were made towards the same purpose. Each camp would have a Personnel division of the port adjutant's office which was designed to keep proper records on soldiers. Specifically, it was designed to keep track of service records, individual equipment record, pay card, family insurance information, insurance application information, a personal qualification card, court martial records, etc.

=== Camp Stuart ===
Named in honor of confederate general J.E.B Stuart, Camp Stuart was the largest of all Port of Embarkation camps with a soldier population of 115,000. Camp Stuart construction began on July 30 of 1917 and continuing throughout 1918. Camp headquarters officially opened on August 21 of 1917. Camp Stuart included an embarkation hospital facility that opened on January 21, 1918, and it became the camp's primary function following armistice day until its closure on November 29 of 1919. Camp Stuart had 309 acres with 500 buildings (296 of those being barracks), 21 officer quarters, and a bed capacity of 1754. By June 30 of 1919, costs were as high as 14,600,000. Camp Stuart would house the 60th Air Defense Artillery Regiment who held up decisively well during the Battle of St.Mihel and Meuse Argonne Offensive.

=== Camp Alexander ===
Of all Port of Embarkation camps, Camp Alexander stands out among them all in being specifically designed for African American soldiers. It was named in honor of John Hanks Alexander, the first black graduate of West Point. and during the time of operation saw 50,000 men. White people were present at the camp, but very few and only in officer roles which would often oversee Labour Battalions. Labour Battalions were made a primary task for black soldiers at Camp Alexander with 1100 men working each day andport allegedly averaged over 2,000,000 million hours of work. High Command overseeing the camp reported that the health of Soldiers was in peak condition and that soldier morale was high. From the perspective of actual soldiers of the camp, the story was far different. Riots often broke out and sometimes could turn violent. In one instance, an officer was badly wounded from being hit by a bottle. The ambulance truck trying to transport the injured was nearly wrecked in midst of the chaos. These circumstances ended happening due to two soldiers being arrested for robbing a cash register. The charges were proven to be false. Another instance was a report that soldiers at Camp Alexander were being given improper uniforms. The uniforms soldiers received were used ones from previous wars. Fellow caucasian soldiers who served overseas often did not realize they were American until they actually interacted with them. Tension was so bad that Connecticut congressman John Q. Tilson who investigated the camp in person had once described the conditions as "involuntary solitude".

=== Camp Hill ===
Sitting on the east bank of James river, there was Camp Hill. Despite having a rather small soldier population of just 7000 men, it still managed to provide soldiers enough to meet needs. Some of the necessities Camp Hill had were: 106 barracks that could fit about 66 men per barrack; 10 officer barracks with 38 rooms in one building; and a latrine with both hot and cold water with every four barracks having a latrine. Troops first arrived at camp hill on August 5, 1917, and were part of the 1st squadron 14th Cavalry. Some troops initially had to stay in tents when the camp first opened as almost all barracks had not been finished. Only 3% of all Camp Hill's buildings had actually been completed up until October 6, 1917. During a portion of Camp Hill's operation, it was a place where troops passed through more than they trained. Though this was much more common before January 1918. The usual reasons troops passed through were to accompany horses or mail shipments that were to be sent to Europe. Though another reason was that many troops who passed through camp hill had been separated from their infantry. A prior function of camp hill was their hospital which did not operate under a camp commander. The building functions were later switched to being used for camp infantry.

=== Camp Morrison ===
Located near the tracks of the Chesapeake and Ohio railway, Construction of camp Morrison began on September 14, 1917, and was completed by the J.G White Engineering Corporation from New York City. Camp Morrison had 54 military organizations present with 9091 soldiers and 329 officers would contribute overseas. 216 soldiers and 54 officers were not part of the air service troops, but rather medical corps as part of the medical detachment. Each organization would have one officer and four soldiers. The camp had in total 24 warehouses at 125,000 cubic feet capacity. 27 barracks were present with a variety of utilities and enough to house 204 men per barrack. The camp had 27 mess halls, one administration building with ten office rooms, and one hospital with 350 beds, though only 30 nurses. Camp Morrison had a wide variety of needs and even had their own railroad connected to the camp which extended its distance. Camp Morrison's specific function was to organize and train air service units to the highest degree. At the same time, it offered many composites for soldiers' pleasure. Not only was camp Morrison successful in training and in service, but also in activity. They had their own camp baseball league and a camp baseball team was organized to compete against other port of embarkation camps. Camp Morrison would win the championship and do the same with a camp football team.

== World War II reactivation ==
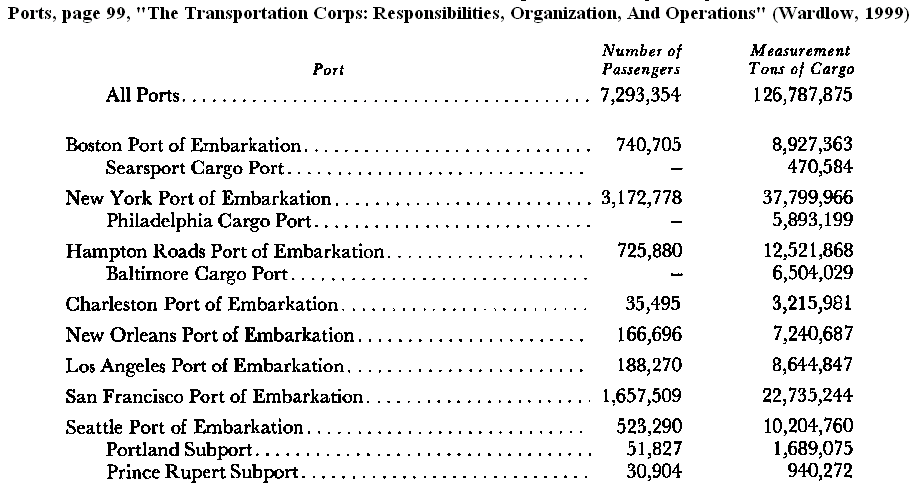
Army Ports: Passengers and tons of cargo embarked during the period December 1941—August 1945.

Hampton Roads Port of Embarkation (HRPOE or HRPE (Note: Both abbreviations are found in official references.)) was the third largest United States Army Transportation Corps port of embarkation in terms of passengers and second in terms of cargo tonnage on the East Coast of the United States during World War II. Until June 1942 Hampton Roads was a sub-port of the New York Port of Embarkation.

Hampton Roads Port of Embarkation, administratively based in Newport News, Virginia, included the exclusively cargo sub port of Baltimore. The port, along with its Baltimore cargo port and the Philadelphia cargo port that was a sub port of the New York Port of Embarkation (NYPOE), was mainly focused on shipments to the Mediterranean and European areas. Troops were temporarily quartered in embarkation camps where the port was responsible for ensuring final outfitting before embarkation with HRPOE's Camp Patrick Henry being capable of housing 24,100 troops.

Shortly after its activation 15 June 1942 the port was responsible for combat loading the Western Task Force of the North African invasion assault convoy. All of the combat loaded ships from the United States bound for North Africa, except Seatrain New Jersey with the 39th Combat Team embarked at the NYPOE, were loaded at the HRPOE. The port was again called on to combat load the reinforced 45th Infantry Division for Sicily. HRPOE had developed an efficient plan in which combat loaded ships were loaded in two "flights" whereby the first group would practice debarkation in the Chesapeake while the second group loaded and the second group would practice as the first refueled and topped off supplies.

During the period of its operation as of August 1945 its passenger total was 725,880 and cargo tonnage was 12,521,868 and its subsidiary Baltimore cargo port accounted for 6,504,028 tons.

== See also ==
- New York Port of Embarkation (NYPOE)
- San Francisco Port of Embarkation (SFPOE)
- Seattle Port of Embarkation
- Boston Port of Embarkation (BPOE)
- New Orleans Port of Embarkation
- Charleston Port of Embarkation (CPOE)
- Los Angeles Port of Embarkation

== References cited ==
- Bykofsky, Joseph; Larson, Harold (1990). The Technical Services—The Transportation Corps: Operations Overseas. United States Army In World War II. Washington, DC: Center Of Military History, United States Army. LCCN 56-60000.
- Howe, George F. (1993). The Mediterranean Theater of Operations — Northwest Africa: Seizing The Initiative In The West. United States Army In World War II. Washington, DC: Center Of Military History, United States Army. LCCN 57060021.
- Huston, James A. (1966). The Sinews of War: Army Logistics 1775—1953. Army Historical Series. Washington, DC: Center Of Military History, United States Army. p. 346. ISBN 9780160899140. LCCN 66060015.
- Library of Virginia. "United States Army Signal Corps, Hampton Roads, Virginia. United States Army Signal Corps Photograph Collection, Hampton Roads Embarkation Series, 1942- 1946". Library of Virginia.
- Wardlow, Chester (1999). The Technical Services—The Transportation Corps: Responsibilities, Organization, And Operations. United States Army In World War II. Washington, DC: Center Of Military History, United States Army. LCCN 99490905.
- Wardlow, Chester (1956). The Technical Services—The Transportation Corps: Movements, Training, And Supply. United States Army In World War II. Washington, DC: Center Of Military History, United States Army. LCCN 55-60003.
- War Department (1944). FM55-10 Water Transportation: Oceanging Vessels (PDF). War Department Field Manual. Washington, DC: United States Department of War.
