= George H. McManus =

United States Army general

George McManus
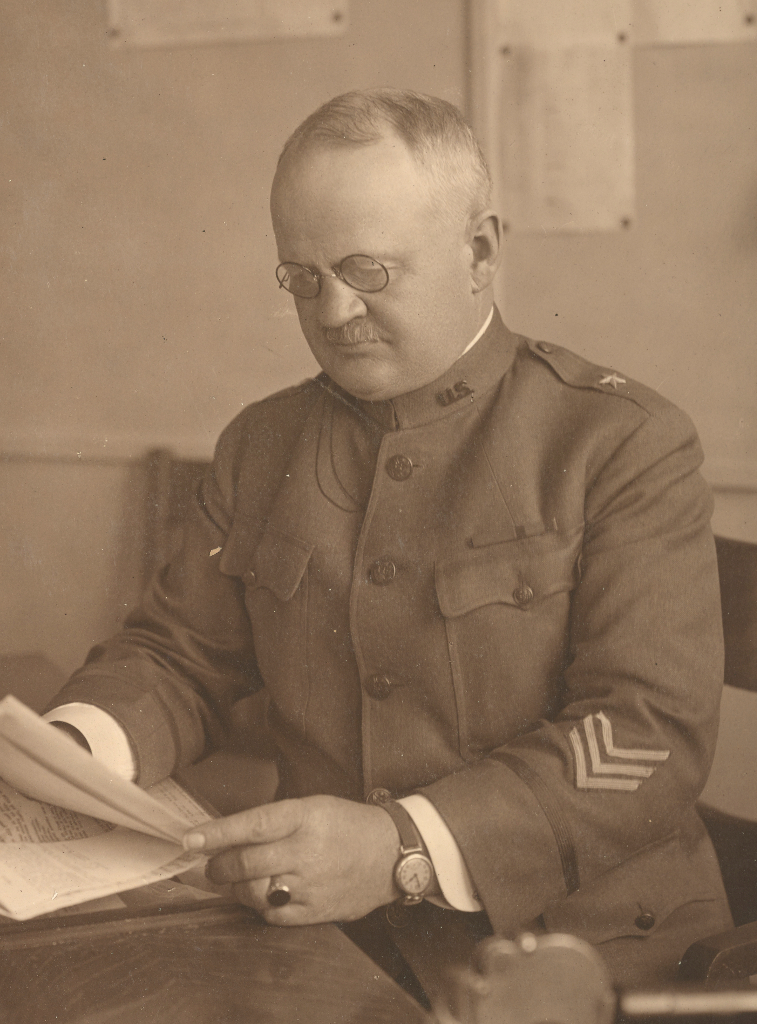
- Brigadier general McManus in 1919
- Born: December 23, 1867; Hudson, Iowa
- Died: August 27, 1954 (aged 86); San Francisco, California
- Burial place: San Francisco National Cemetery
- Military career
- Allegiance: United States
- Branch: United States Army
- Service years: 1893–1931
- Rank: Major General
- Unit: Coast Artillery
- Conflicts: Philippine–American War, World War I
- Awards: Navy Cross, Distinguished Service Medal

Major General George Henry McManus (December 23, 1867 – August 8, 1954) was a U.S. Army general.

== Early life ==
George Henry McManus was born December 23, 1867, in Hudson, Iowa. He graduated with a degree from Iowa State Teachers College, and then entered the United States Military Academy and graduated number nine of fifty-one in the class of 1893.

== Military career ==
McManus was commissioned in the artillery, and he stayed in the Coast Artillery when the Artillery Corps divided into field and Coast Artillery in 1907. He served in the China Relief Expedition and the Philippine–American War, as well as in the Atlantic, the Pacific, and the Philippines.

During World War I, he was a troop movement officer at the port of embarkation in Hoboken, New Jersey. On October 1, 1918, he was promoted to brigadier general. For his performance of this duty, he received the Distinguished Service Medal and the Navy Cross.

On December 1, 1931, he retired as a brigadier general.

== Personal life ==
On January 7, 1897, he married Gertrude Kessler, and they had four children: Sarah C. McManus, George Henry McManus Jr., Thomas Kessler McManus, and Mary Alice McManus. Mcmanus died in the Presidio of San Francisco on August 27, 1954. He is buried in San Francisco National Cemetery.
