= Fisherman's Memorial =

Fisherman's Memorial or Fishermen's Memorial may refer to:

- Steveston Fisherman's Memorial, Steveston, British Columbia
- Gloucester Fisherman's Memorial, Gloucester, Massachusetts, United States
- Fishermen's Memorial State Park, Rhode Island, United States
- Fisherman's Memorial (Palacios, Texas)
- Safe Return (statue), Bellingham, Washington
- Seattle Fishermen's Memorial, Seattle, Washington, United States
