= Port of Seattle =

Port authority in Washington, United States

Coordinates: 47°36′50″N 122°21′15″W

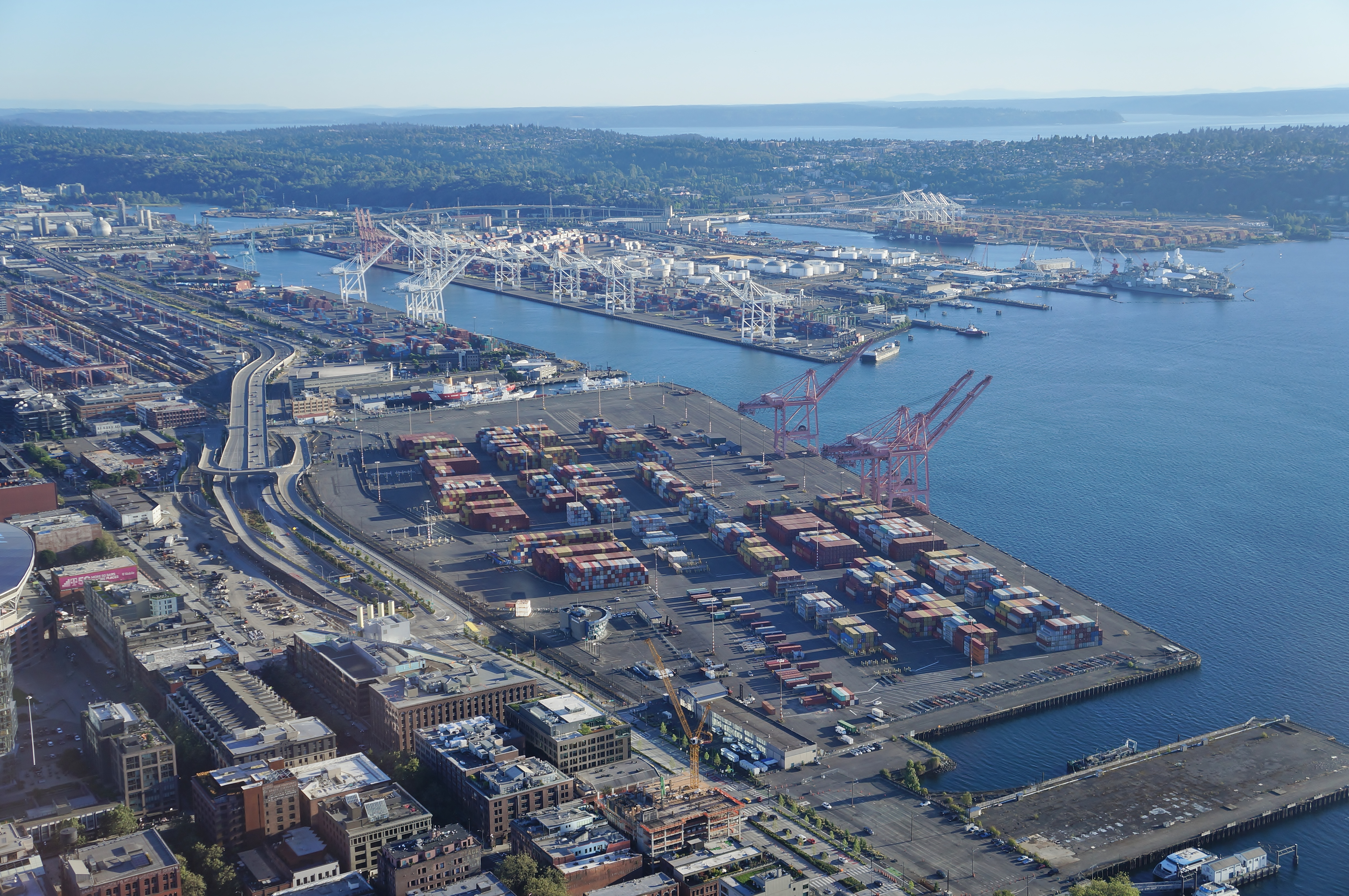
- Aerial view of the Seattle harbor, 2022, showing numerous container terminals operated by the Port of Seattle

Agency overview
- Formed: September 5, 1911
- Jurisdiction: King County, Washington
- Headquarters: 2711 Alaskan Way Seattle, Washington, U.S.
- Employees: 2,150 (2018)
- Annual budget: $670 million (2018)
- Agency executive: Stephen P. Metruck, Executive Director
- Child agencies: Seattle-Tacoma International Airport; Port of Seattle Police Department; Port of Seattle Fire Department
- Website: portseattle.org

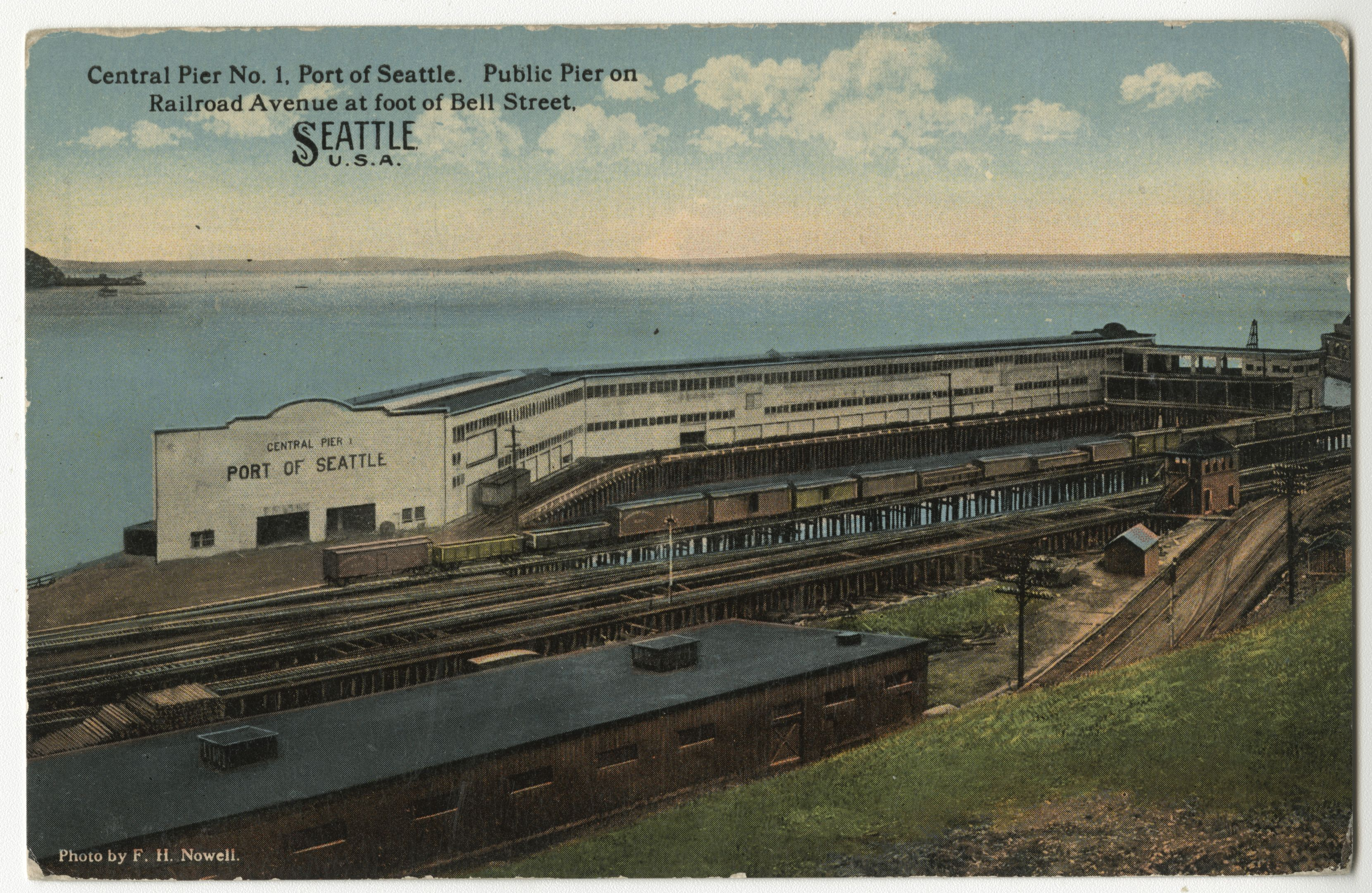
Bell Street Terminal, circa 1915

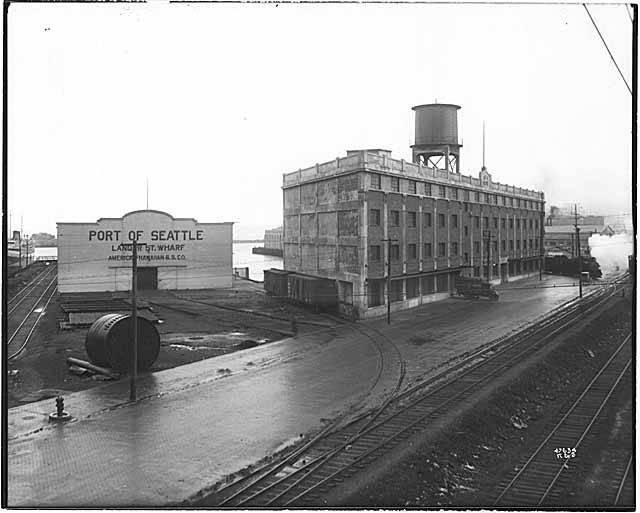
South Lander Street facilities on the East Waterway of the Duwamish, circa 1915

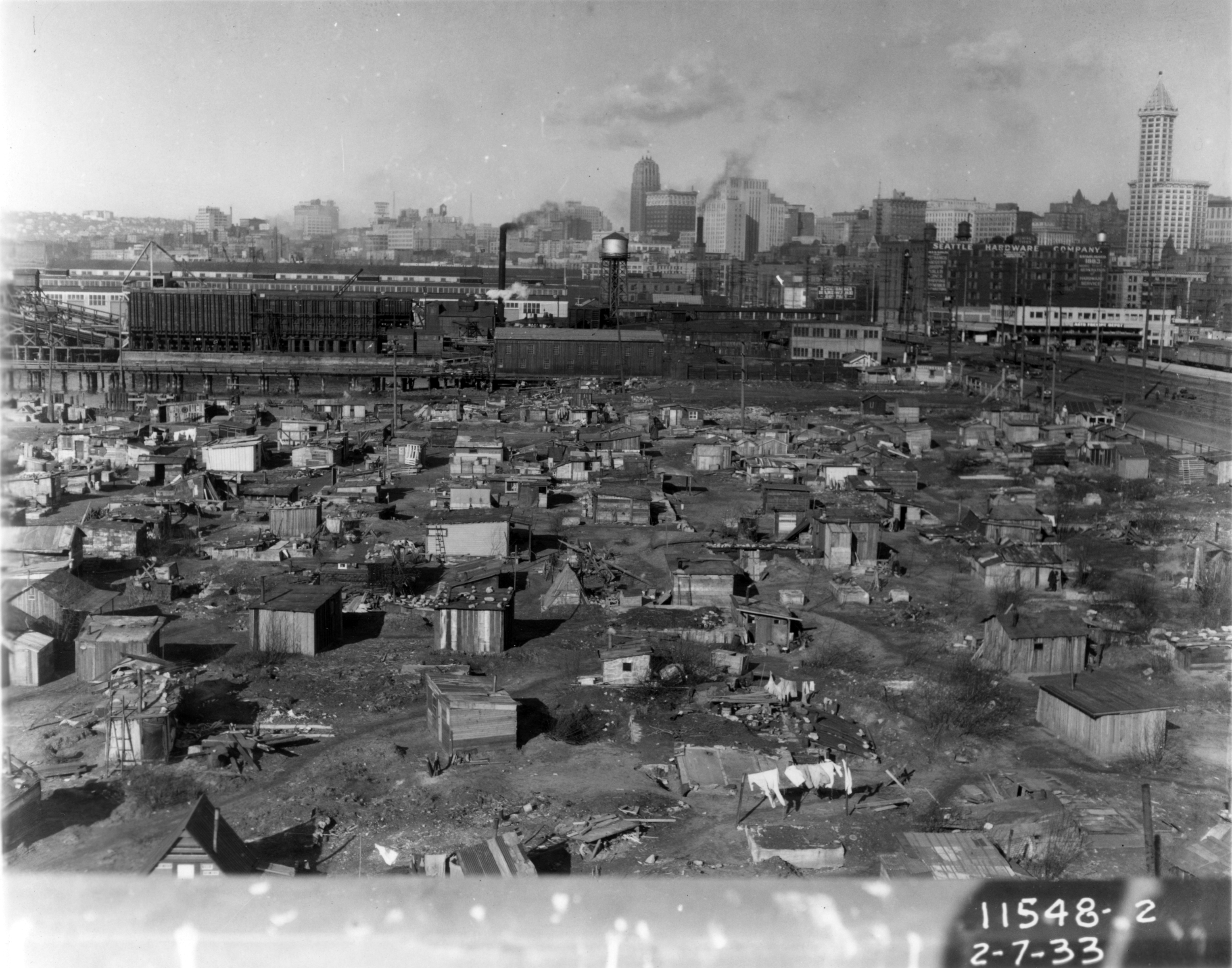
Hooverville on the Seattle tideflats, 1933

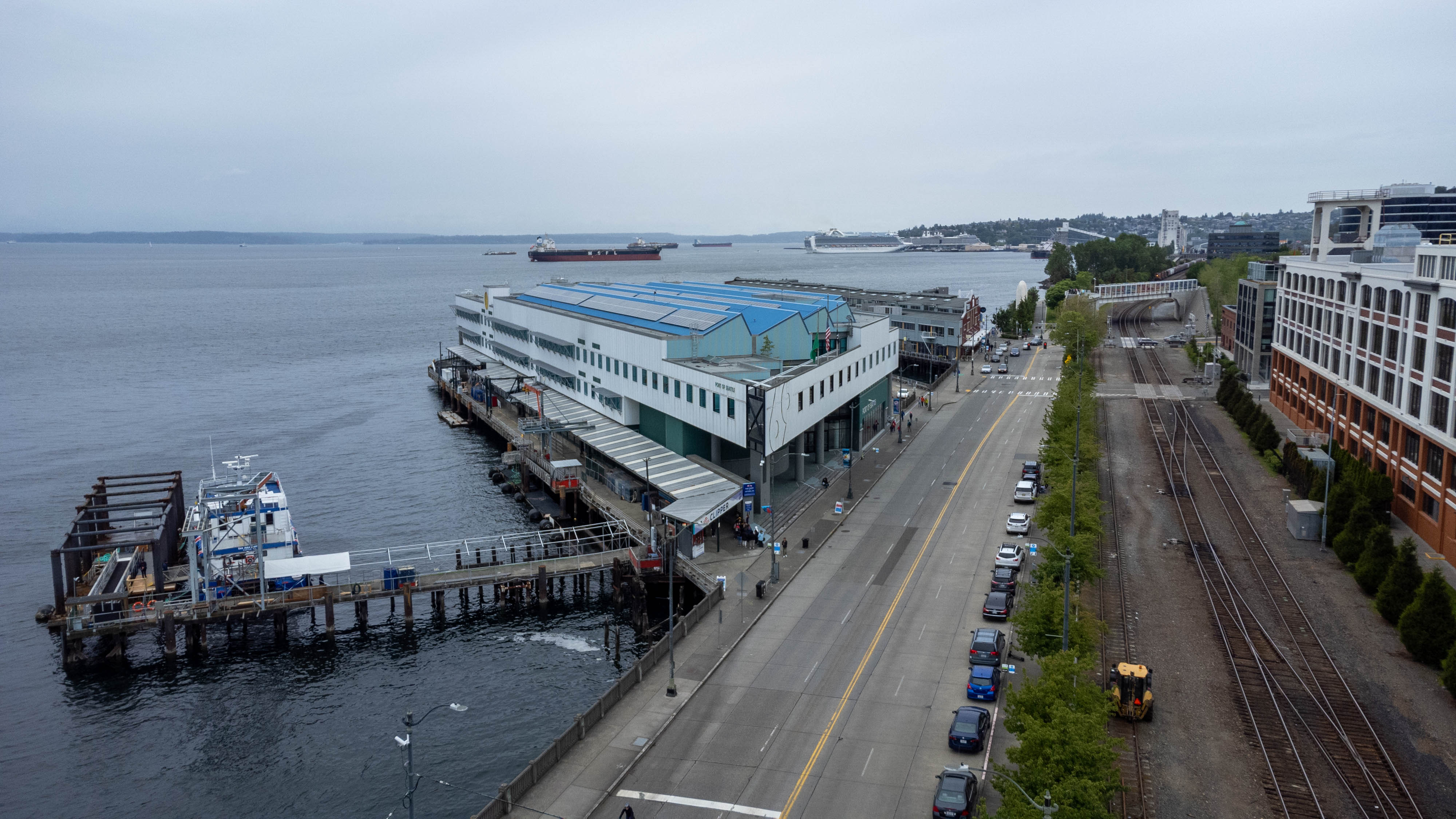
Pier 69, the present-day Headquarters for the Port of Seattle.

The Port of Seattle is a public agency based in King County, Washington. It oversees the seaport of Seattle and Seattle–Tacoma International Airport. With an array of properties ranging from parks and waterfront real estate to one of the largest airports and container terminals on the West Coast, the Port of Seattle is one of the Pacific Northwest's leading economic engines.

Its creation was approved by the voters of King County on September 5, 1911, and authorized by the Port District Act. The Port of Seattle is managed by a five-member Port Commission who are elected at large by the voters of King County and serve four-year terms. (Both the size of the commission and the length of the terms have varied over time.) The Commissioners govern the Port, lead all inter-governmental functions, and oversee the Executive Director.

== History ==
Over the course of more than a century, the Port of Seattle has provided facilities for an expansion of Seattle's shipping trade, later including container shipping and the Seattle–Tacoma International Airport, and helped to generate increasing economic activity in the area. Although the Second World War halted much of the global shipping trade and negatively impacted the economy, Seattle again became a major port after the war.

=== Creation ===
At the time of the creation of the Port of Seattle as an institution, Seattle was already a major port. However, its Central Waterfront was somewhat chaotic, due in part to having eight (and in some places nine) more or less parallel railroad tracks along the ill-maintained wooden planking of Railroad Avenue. Although the 1903–1906 construction of the Great Northern Tunnel through downtown had alleviated some of the chaos because trains that were merely passing through no longer needed to use the waterfront route, it did not change the basic fact that this "avenue" along the Central Waterfront was 150 feet (46 m) wide, built over water, difficult to traverse, and separated Downtown from the piers. To further complicate matters, tracks were owned by three separate private corporations, the Great Northern Railway, the Northern Pacific Railroad, and the Pacific Coast Company, which operated the Columbia and Puget Sound Railroad.

Furthermore, the railroad companies owned the piers and warehouses where the rails and ships came together, inevitably creating an anti-competitive effect for other businesses wishing to ship through Seattle.

As early as 1890, Virgil Bogue had proposed public ownership not only of the Seattle port, but of all ports in the then newly formed state. As part of gaining statehood, Washington had gained control over its own coastal waters, previously under direct federal control. Initially, it looked like Bogue might prevail, at least with respect to Seattle, but Thomas Burke and others representing the railroad interests managed to stall the initial Harbor Lines Commission plan into oblivion through a series of legal actions. Still, Bogue continued to win allies among populists, progressives, the labor movement, and even some of the railroads (though not the Great Northern). Among the more prominent allies were City Engineer Reginald H. Thomson and his one-time assistant George F. Cotterill. Cotterill went on to serve as a state senator and later as mayor of Seattle. Even before the Port was established, the latter two scored several victories simply by devising plans (a tunnel through Downtown; a uniform alignment of piers) that made enough sense that the railroads and others adopted them more or less voluntarily. Additionally, Cotterill as a state senator led a state-level effort to authorize port districts, though he was out of office by the time it came to fruition.

In 1910, pressure toward public ownership of port facilities increased when Tacoma, Washington began building the state's first municipally owned dock. Even The Seattle Times, normally opposed to municipal ownership, began to advocate for similar measures in Seattle. On March 14, 1911, the Port District Act became state law, allowing the formation of port districts.

The Port of Seattle was created by the state of Washington in 1911. Under the Port District Act, the port's construction plan had to be presented and voted upon before construction could start. One of the biggest factors that swayed the votes in favor of creating the port was the prospect of economic growth, especially given the impending 1914 completion of the Panama Canal. The first Commission Report for 1912 records that: "The Port of Seattle came into existence on September 5, 1911, by a vote of the people of the Port District held on that date in accordance with the Port District Act of March 14, 1911. The work of the commission for the first six months was confined almost entirely to the preparation of projects which were duly approved by the people at a special election held on March 5, 1912."

=== Early development ===
From the first, the Port of Seattle was faced with the fact that most of the key properties on the Central Waterfront on Elliott Bay were already in the hands of the railroads and other vested interests. This meant that most Port-owned facilities would be in more peripheral areas: to the south, the newly dredged East Waterway of the Duwamish between the newly filled mainland Industrial District and the newly created Harbor Island; to the north, where the Great Northern Railway occupied only part of Smith Cove; and 6 miles (9.7 km) north in Ballard, newly annexed to Seattle, where Salmon Bay would form the outlet of the new Lake Washington Ship Canal connecting Lake Washington and Lake Union to salt water.

The Port commissioned the first automobile ferry in Western Washington, Leschi, which launched December 6, 1913. The Leschi operated on Lake Washington, providing service from Leschi Park to two locations on the east side of the lake. Earlier that year, Port construction began with the creation of a home port for Puget Sound fishermen; Fishermen's Terminal on Salmon Bay was completed in 1914 and has been the U.S. Northern Pacific Fishing Fleet's home for operations, provisioning and repairs ever since. Work also began that year on a grain terminal at South Hanford Street on the East Waterway, intended to give Washington growers an alternative to shipping their grain down the Columbia River to Portland, Oregon.

Another project begun in 1913, the Bell Street Terminal, the Port's new headquarters near the north end of the Central Waterfront, loaded its first cargo October 28, 1913 while the warehouse facilities were still under construction, and by 1914 served much of the Puget Sound Mosquito Fleet and provided easy access for farmers around Puget Sound to bring their produce to Pike Place Market. A viaduct to Pike Place Market and a rooftop park, solarium, and pool were added in 1915. "but by the 1920s, the park had developed an unsavory reputation and was closed."

Other early Port projects included cold storage facilities at Bell Street Terminal for local fishermen and on the East Waterway at South Spokane Street for Eastern Washington farmers, as well as two massive piers at Smith Cove. Pier A, later Pier 40 and (since 1944) Pier 90 was 2,530 feet (770 m) long and 310 feet (94 m) wide. It was the largest pier in the world until the construction of Pier B, later Pier 41 and (since 1944) Pier 91, 50 feet (15 m) longer.

=== Stagnation in the 1920s and 1930s ===
A more conservative Port Commission in the 1920s largely put an end to new initiatives of this sort. Trade continued to grow slowly, with an emphasis on China and (especially) Japan, but other West Coast and Gulf Coast ports increasingly copied Seattle's initiatives of the prior decade, and the Port of Tacoma in particular undercut Seattle on prices. A price war through the 1920s resulted in a 1929 agreement through the American Association of Port Authorities to set uniform wharf rates.

Seattle and the state of Washington were not well-positioned coming into the Great Depression that began in 1929. Due to over-fishing and excessive logging, the natural resources that had provided much of the basis for the local economy were being depleted. The salmon catch was down below a tenth of what it had been in the peak year, 1913, and timber production was also significantly down even before the national economy began to tumble. By October 1931, low-rent housing in Seattle was oversaturated, and a Hooverville began to form in the abandoned Skinner & Eddy land along Elliott Bay, site of present-day (2023) Terminal 46. In its first few months it was twice removed by Seattle Police "sweeps," but eventually a compromise was reached that allowed a shantytown to persist for almost a decade.

=== World War II and after ===
The economic depression and labor troubles of the 1930s (see following section Politics and the Port) were followed by the wartime economy of World War II. Even before the U.S. entered the war, export of scrap metal to Japan, of course, went to zero, and export of Eastern Washington apples to Europe fared little better, but with the Soviet Union newly an ally, Seattle became a base for trans-oceanic shipping to Siberia. The Seattle-Tacoma Shipbuilding Corporation (Todd Pacific) on Harbor Island scored contracts to build 45 destroyers, which put it in a tie with Bethlehem Steel San Francisco for largest purely military ship production on the U.S. West Coast. The U.S. Navy took over the massive Smith Cove piers. The state legislature granted the Port of Seattle and other port authorities around the state exceptional powers to pursue defense-related projects without requiring the public to vote on the bond issues, which enabled the port to purchase additional land on the Harbor Island side of the East Waterway and to pursue major projects on the mainland side: Pier 42 (now part of Terminal 46), with its pilings as high as 70 feet (21 m), and a new grain elevator at South Hanford Street.

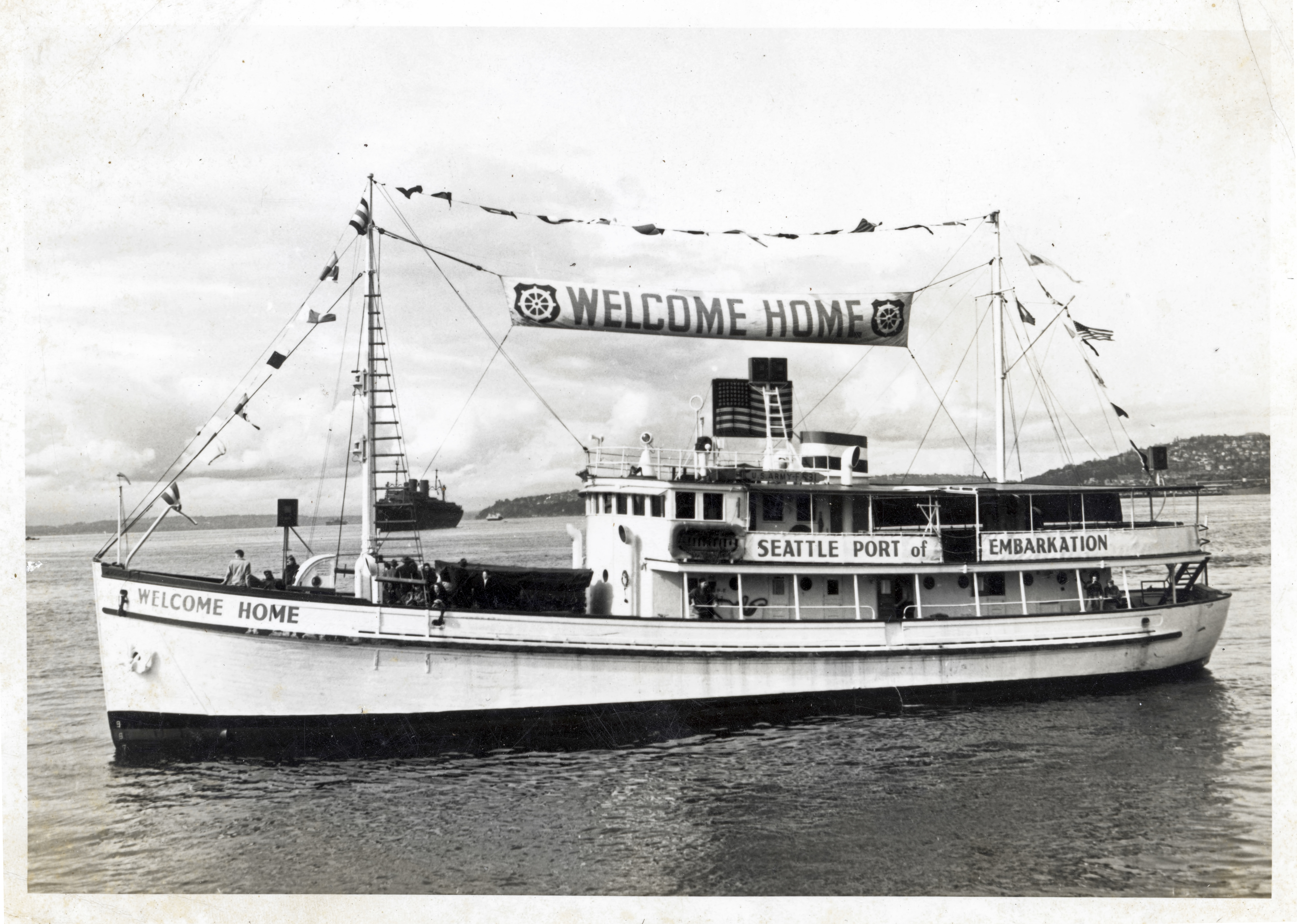
Freight-Supply Vessel USAV FS-31, serving as a welcoming home ship by the US Army Transportation Corp at the port of Seattle in early 1946.

U.S. entry into the war brought on further changes: effectively, the entire harbor on Elliott Bay became a U.S. military port for the duration. The Pacific Steamship Company piers south of Downtown were reworked into a Port of Embarkation (part of which now constitutes Coast Guard Station Seattle, the rest of which is part of Terminal 46). One of the longest-lasting legacies of the war years was the comprehensive May 1, 1944 renumbering of all of Seattle's Elliott Bay piers into a single system encompassing the bay.

While the War years were a boom time for Seattle and its port, the immediate postwar years were not. Wartime production had made Seattle-based Boeing the region's largest employer; peace resulted in 70,000 Boeing layoffs. Nor did Seattle's port get its expected share of post-war commercial shipping traffic: for the first time ever, it was outdone even by its neighbor to the south, the far smaller city of Tacoma. While the Port of Seattle had launched what was to prove a very successful airport, wartime use of the Elliott Bay and Duwamish River waterfront had not established a particularly good basis for a peacetime port. When the military's new piers reverted to civilian use, they took business away from existing older facilities and, consequently, away from the heart of town. Further, it had been over a decade since the Port had run a major national and international publicity campaign. And there were labor troubles (see following section Politics and the Port).

The Port was not entirely without a strategy. On the shore of the area around Pioneer Square and immediately south, they purchased and modernized Piers 43 and 45 through 49 from the Pacific Coast Company Piers 43, 45, 46, and 47 were eventually incorporated into present-day Terminal 46. Fishermen's Terminal at Salmon Bay was enlarged and upgraded, as was the East Waterway Dock on Harbor Island. Still, they failed to support Eastern Washington farmers with a modern grain terminal, and that trade was lost, for the time, to Portland and Tacoma.

In 1949 the U.S. Department of Commerce designated a foreign-trade zone (FTZ) on Harbor Island. At the urging of the local business community, the Port invested heavily in gaining this designation and in building the facility, but it almost certainly turned out to be a money-loser over the next few decades. FTZ status was vastly expanded in 1989, encompassing virtually all of the Port's seaport and airport acreage, a much better proposition than the single small facility.

=== The Fifties ===
By 1952, it was clear that Seattle's maritime sector had not made a post-war recovery commensurate with other U.S. ports. Many companies were wary of doing business in Seattle in the wake of the 1948 strike (see section Politics and the Port below); a further strike in 1952 and conflicts within the Port Commission and between the Port Commission and Port management certainly did not alleviate these concerns. Things finally began to turn around, or at least level out, in late summer of 1953, when Howard M. Burke was hired away from his position as Seattle-based district manager at the American Hawaiian Steamship Company to be the new general manager of the Port. He emerged as the effective leader of the Port with projects such as expanding the grain terminal at South Hanford Street, building the massive Shilshole Bay Marina in Ballard, purchasing the Ames Terminal (which became Terminal 5) in West Seattle on the West Waterway of the Duwamish, and purchasing Pier 28 from the Milwaukee Road, which filled in a gap in Port-owned land on the mainland side of the East Waterway and paved the way for modernization of that portion of the waterfront. By 1956, foreign commerce shipping tonnage had recovered to levels not seen since the 1920s. A further proposal to dredge a 350-foot (110 m) wide, 4-mile (6.4 km) channel up the Duwamish River failed to come to fruition due to numerous lawsuits and the annexation of some of the relevant area by Tukwila, Washington, a south-side suburb.

Despite Burke's best efforts, federal changes that introduced a sliding scale to maritime shipping rates in the early 1950s had taken away much of the historic value of Seattle's being the closest major U.S. port to Asia. In 1954, this rate differential had helped San Francisco to outstrip Seattle even in shipping Eastern Washington apples, shipping 78,000 boxes to Seattle's 5,480. The decade saw a series of reports highly critical of the Port, including two that the Port itself commissioned, one from the University of Washington's Bureau of Business Research in 1956, and another from Booz Allen Hamilton in 1958 A 1959 KIRO-TV documentary Lost Cargo put the matter squarely before the public, In a city nearly half of whose GDP came from harbor-related activities, and where the Port controlled 21 of the city's 88 piers and terminals, this was no small thing. A pair of 1960 ballot measures passed by broad margins. One expanded the Port Commission from three members to five, with the two new members elected at large rather than on the longstanding three-district basis. The other allocated US$10 million in bonds to fund modernization. The state government followed this up in 1961 by giving the Port expanded taxing authority, while also following a Booz Allen recommendation to get the Commission out of day-to-day operations, instead establishing separate, professionally-run departments for Planning and Research, Data Processing, Real Estate, Trade Development, and Public Relations.

=== Containerization ===
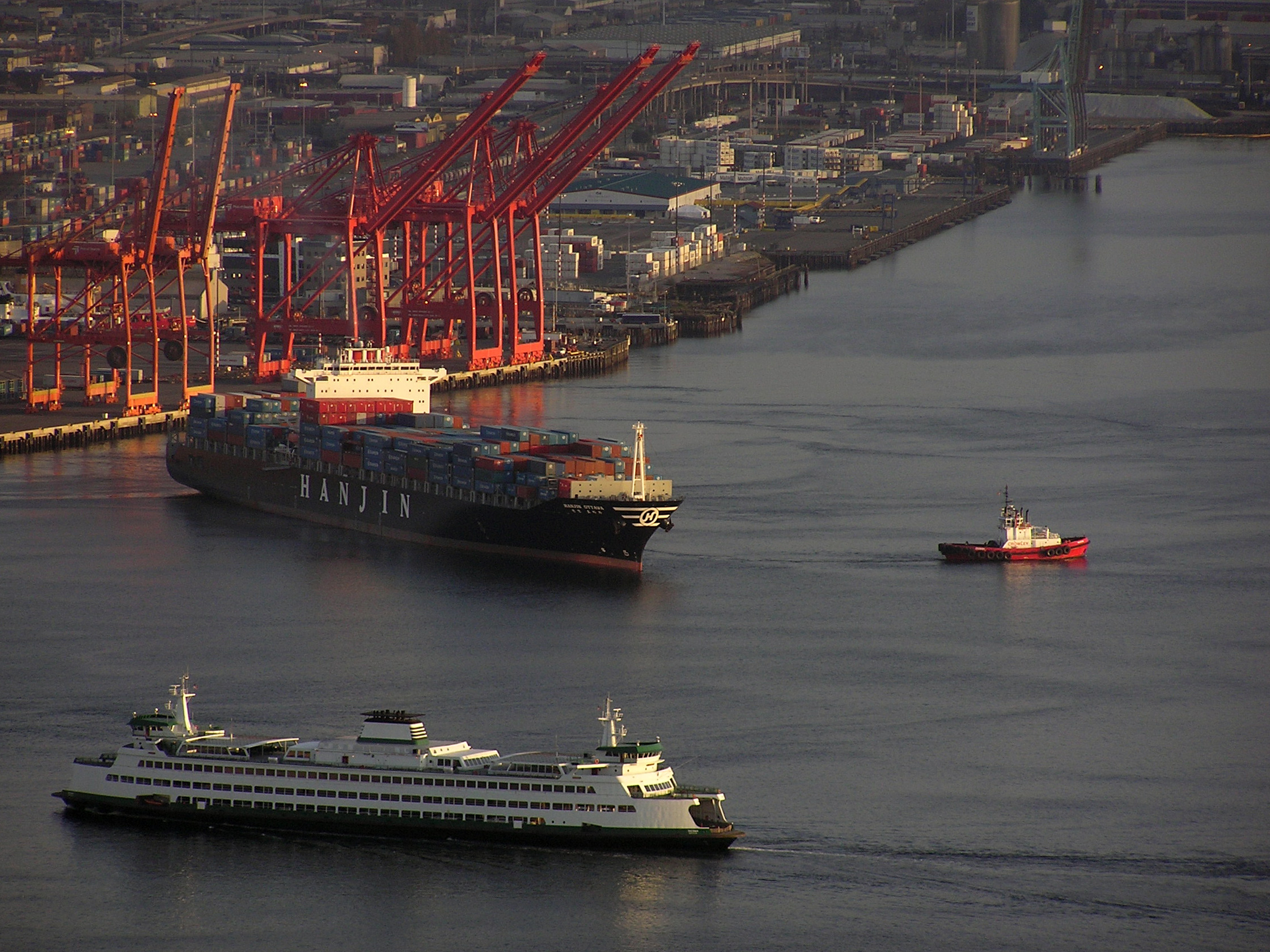
A container ship and the Bainbridge Island ferry near Terminal 46

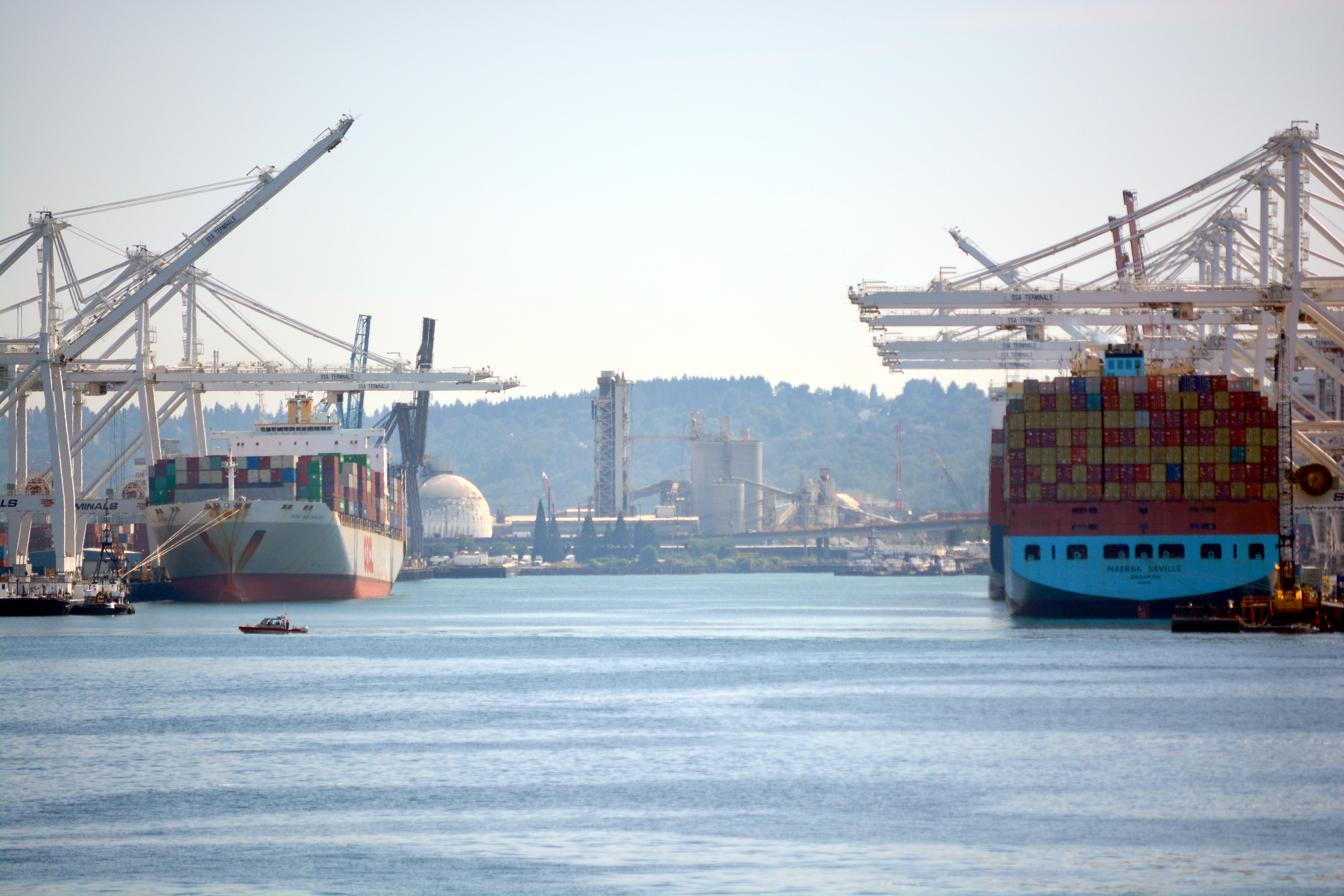
Container cranes on both sides of the East Duwamish Waterway

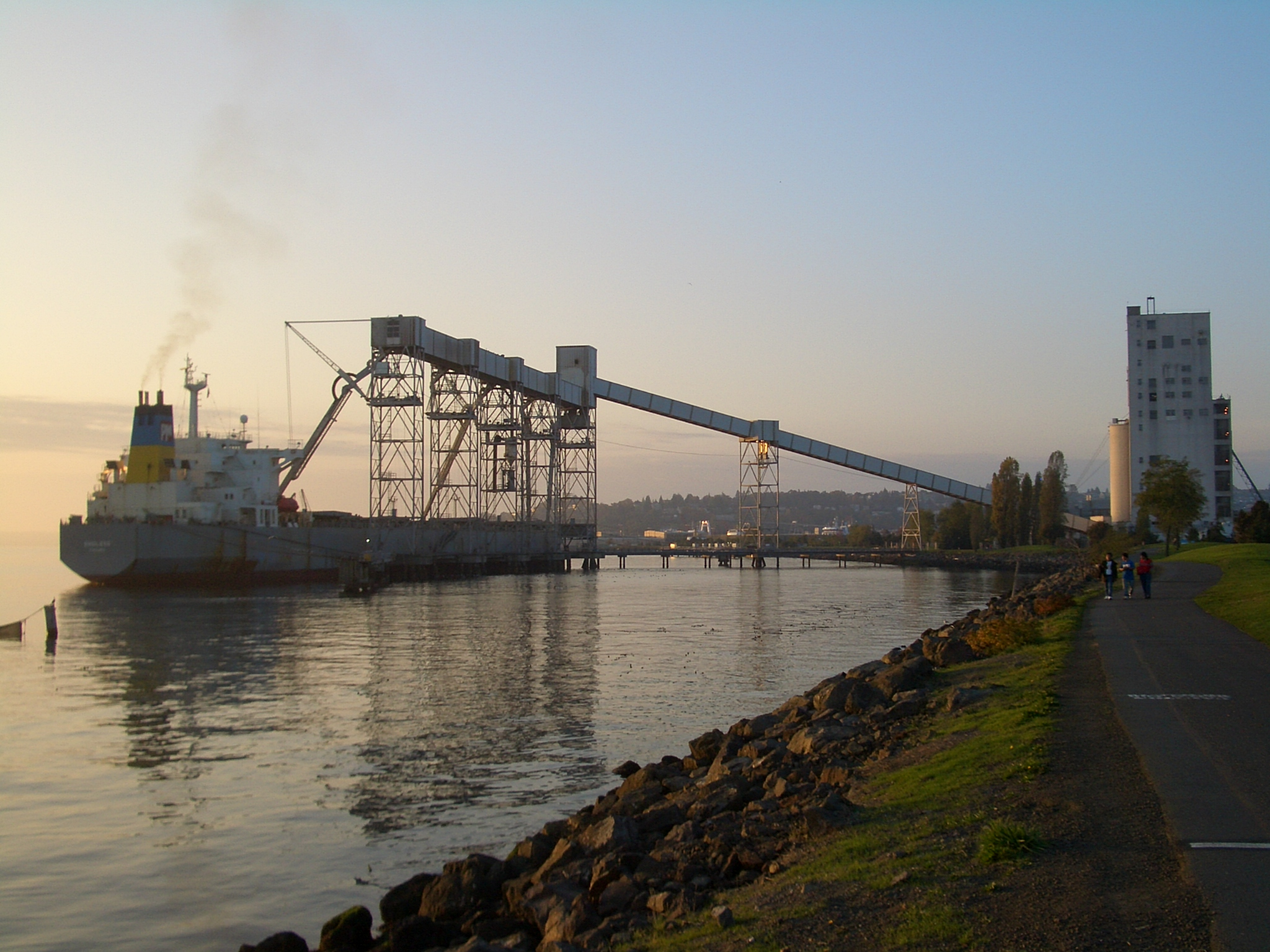
A ship at Pier 86 Grain Terminal

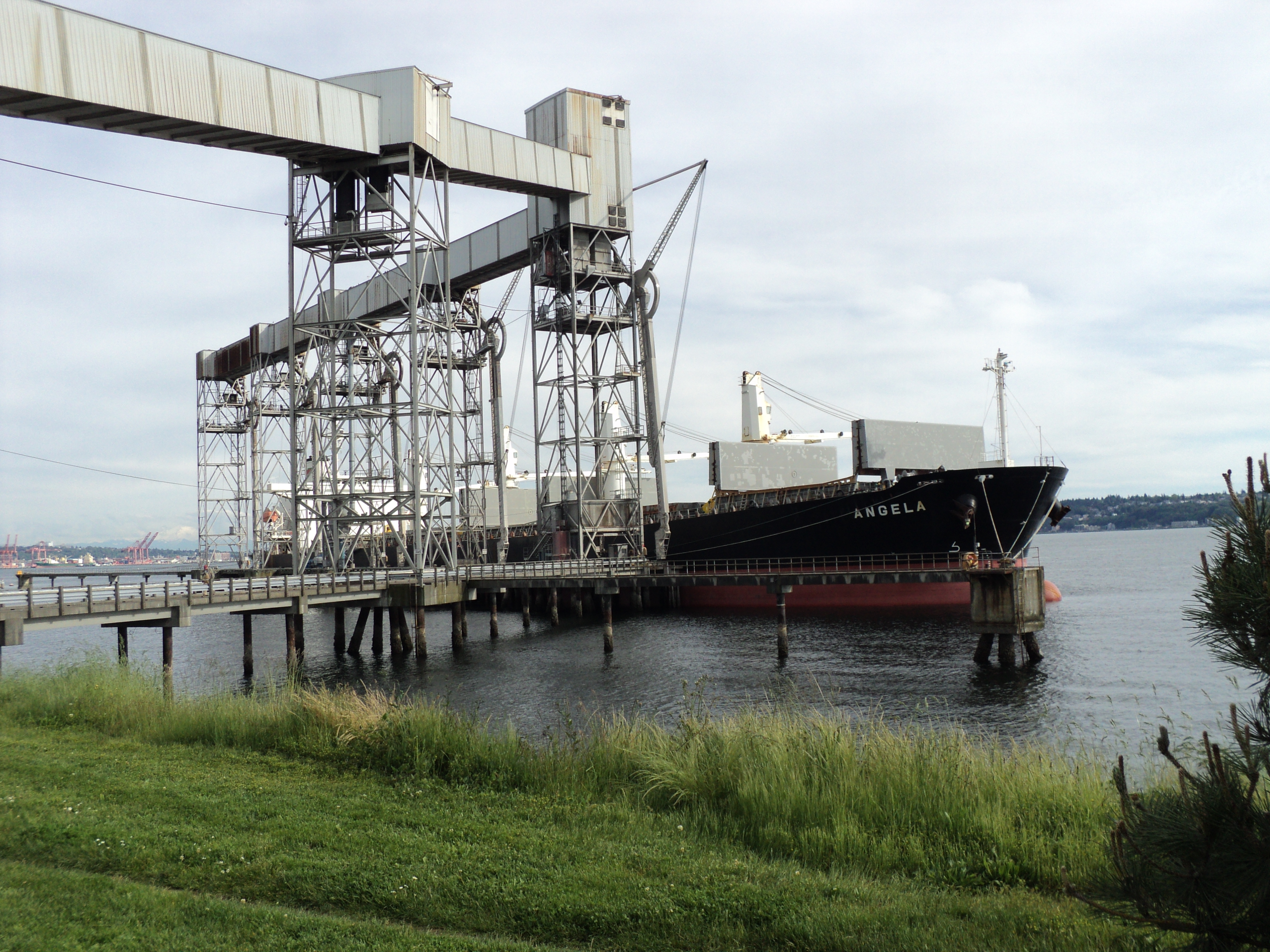
Ship Angela from Panama taking on grain at Pier 86 Grain Terminal

The 1960 Mechanization and Modernization Agreement (M&M) put the ports and labor unions of the West Coast of North America, including Seattle, firmly on the path away from break-bulk cargo toward containerization. Alaska Steamship Company had experimented with containerization as early as 1949, and Sea-Land had begun the move toward international standardization when it shared its patents in 1956, but the unions had initially opposed moving in this direction because of the inevitable loss in jobs from what was, as much as anything, a labor-saving technology. With the benefits offered in the M&M bringing the unions largely on board, the path was clear. Precisely because the Port of Seattle was doing poorly coming into this era, it had more reason than most to make a full-scale embrace of the new technology. In contrast, in particular, to Portland, the Port threw in its lot heavily for the new technology.

In the summer of 1962, with the world's eyes on Seattle as host of the Century 21 Exposition (a World's Fair), the Port announced a US$30 million plan to build a major new container port on the Duwamish Waterway. They also "undert[ook] a six-year program to develop marginal lands and sell them to private industry" to expand the Seattle economy. Two years later, Sea-Land chose the Port's new Terminal 5 (on the site of the former Ames Terminal) as its West Coast headquarters. By the end of the 1960s, Seattle was the West Coast's second-busiest port. When Seattle's economy was slammed by the Boeing Bust around the turn of the decade, the previously moribund port was one of its few bright lights. The Port ended up buying the 25-acre (10-hectare) Boeing Plant 1 site along the Duwamish, which was developed into another modern container facility, Terminal 115, as was the old grain elevator site at South Hanford Street. That grain elevator was effectively replaced by the new Pier 86 Grain Terminal at the foot of Queen Anne Hill southeast of Smith Cove.

=== Continued growth ===
Advantages were not always on Seattle's side. For example, Totem Ocean Trailer Express (now TOTE Group), founded in 1975, opted to base its shipments to Alaska out of Tacoma, where land was cheaper and room for expansion less likely to be an issue. 1975 also was the end of many decades of weekly United Brands banana boat arrivals in Seattle: since then, bananas have arrived in Seattle by rail or truck. For cargoes coming into the U.S. from East Asia to Seattle, the sparsely populated Pacific Northwest, would always have a disadvantage in competing with the Port of Long Beach and the Port of Los Angeles in populous Southern California.

But, in general, the Port continued to expand. The TOTE loss spurred the Port to acquire and stockpile more land along the Duwamish. The Port built a container facility at Terminal 25 for American President Lines (APL), and an assembly facility for foreign cars at Terminal 115. Terminal 28 (later incorporated into Terminal 30) was expanded by 8.5 acres (3.4 ha) for Nissan, and Seattle became a major port of entry for Datsun vehicles. In 1976, the Port reacquired Piers 90 and 91 at Smith Cove from the Navy and focused them, at least initially, on Asian trade. In April 1979, COSCO's Liu Lin Hai docked at Pier 91, then proceeded to Terminal 86 to take on a cargo of American grain bound for China, thereby becoming the first ship from the People's Republic of China ever to visit a U.S. port. Years later, the Port invested in a major cold storage facility and Pier 91, which paid off handsomely when Japan dropped a 1971 ban on fruit imports from Washington. Pier 91 became the chief export point for Washington apples to Japan.

The Port further expanded in the 1980s, with the growth of the China trade and the Port's increased capacity for intermodal transport, with containers transferring between ships and trucks, but especially between ships and rail. Although some carriers shifted operations from Seattle to Tacoma, this was more than compensated by acquisition of new business and the growth of shipping by some of the carriers who remained. Among the new arrivals: toy company Hasbro made Seattle's expanded Terminal 106 its national distribution center and its sole port of entry for container shipments from Asia, and the Port played a large part in Nintendo of America's move from New York City to Redmond, an Eastside suburb of Seattle.

In its early years, the Port had to contend with the fact that the most desirable properties on the Central Waterfront were already occupied by piers, mostly in the hands of the railroads. 70 years later, with the Port's container facilities now completely dominating Seattle's maritime trade, they were confronted with the opposite problem: much of the Central Waterfront, especially the portion north of Pier 59 (the Seattle Aquarium since 1977) had fallen into dereliction. The Port took a leading role in trying to remedy this, with Pat Davis and Paige Miller, the first two women on the Port Commission, taking a particularly large role.

One of the deteriorating properties in question was the Port's own headquarters at the Bell Street Pier (renumbered as Pier 66 in 1944). The Port acquired nearby Pier 69, built in 1900 for the Roslyn Coal & Coke Company and used for many decades by the American Can Company. They refurbished that building and in 1993 moved into it as their new headquarters. (Pier 69 is also the Seattle terminal for Clipper Navigation's Victoria Clipper hydrofoil service.) This move freed up Pier 66, which was demolished along with the Lenora Street Docks (Piers 64 and 65) to make way for the present-day Pier 66/Bell Street Pier, completed in 1996. That pier includes extensive public space, including (as had been briefly the case in the 1910s) a rooftop park. Bell Street Pier also includes the Bell Harbor International Conference Center;"Bell Harbor International Conference Center". Port of Seattle. across the street is Seattle's World Trade Center, completed 1998.

=== Into the 21st Century ===
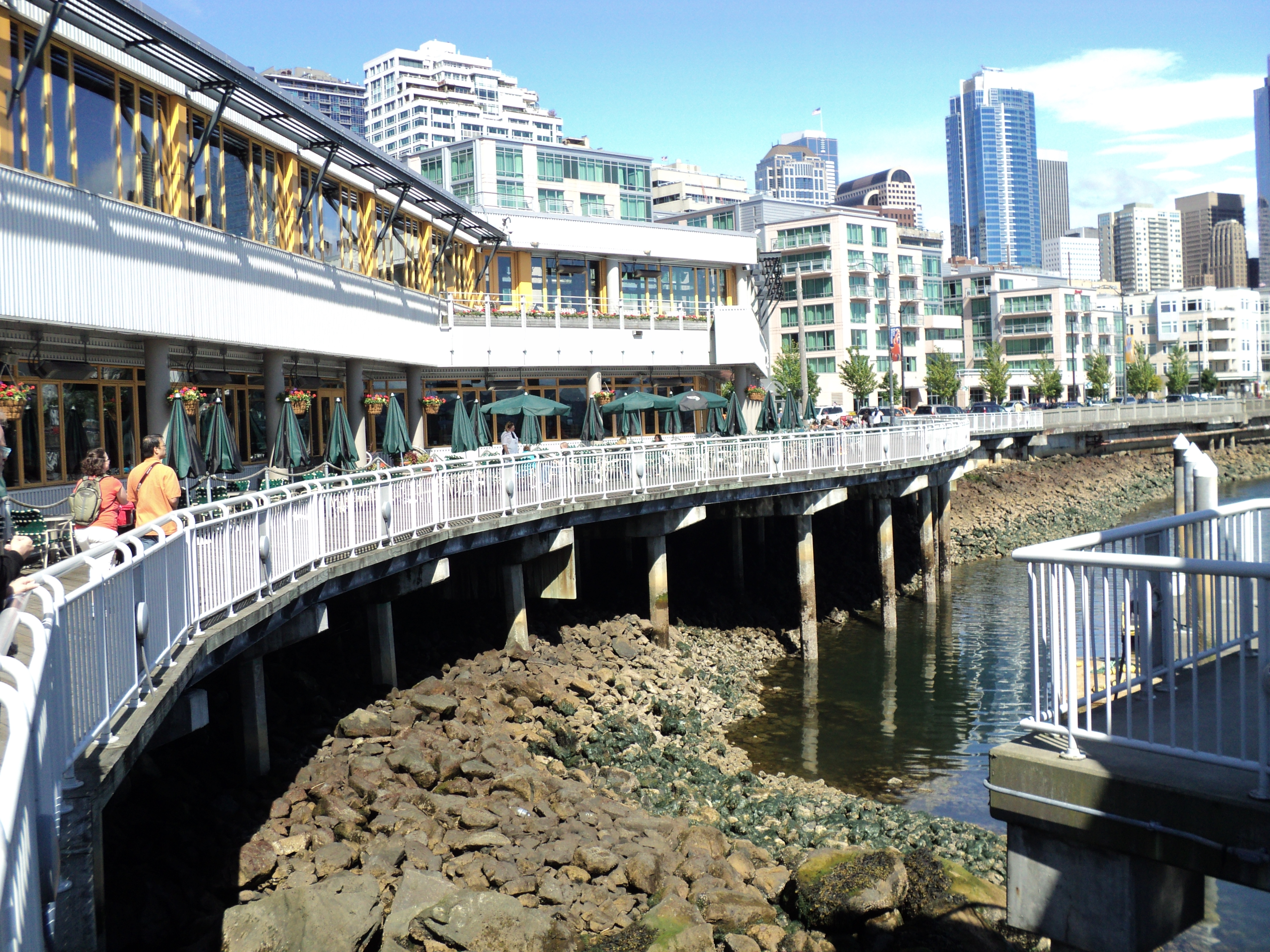
View of restaurant cafe and adjacent marina at Bell Harbor Marina (at the new Bell Street Terminal) along Alaskan Way, Seattle waterfront

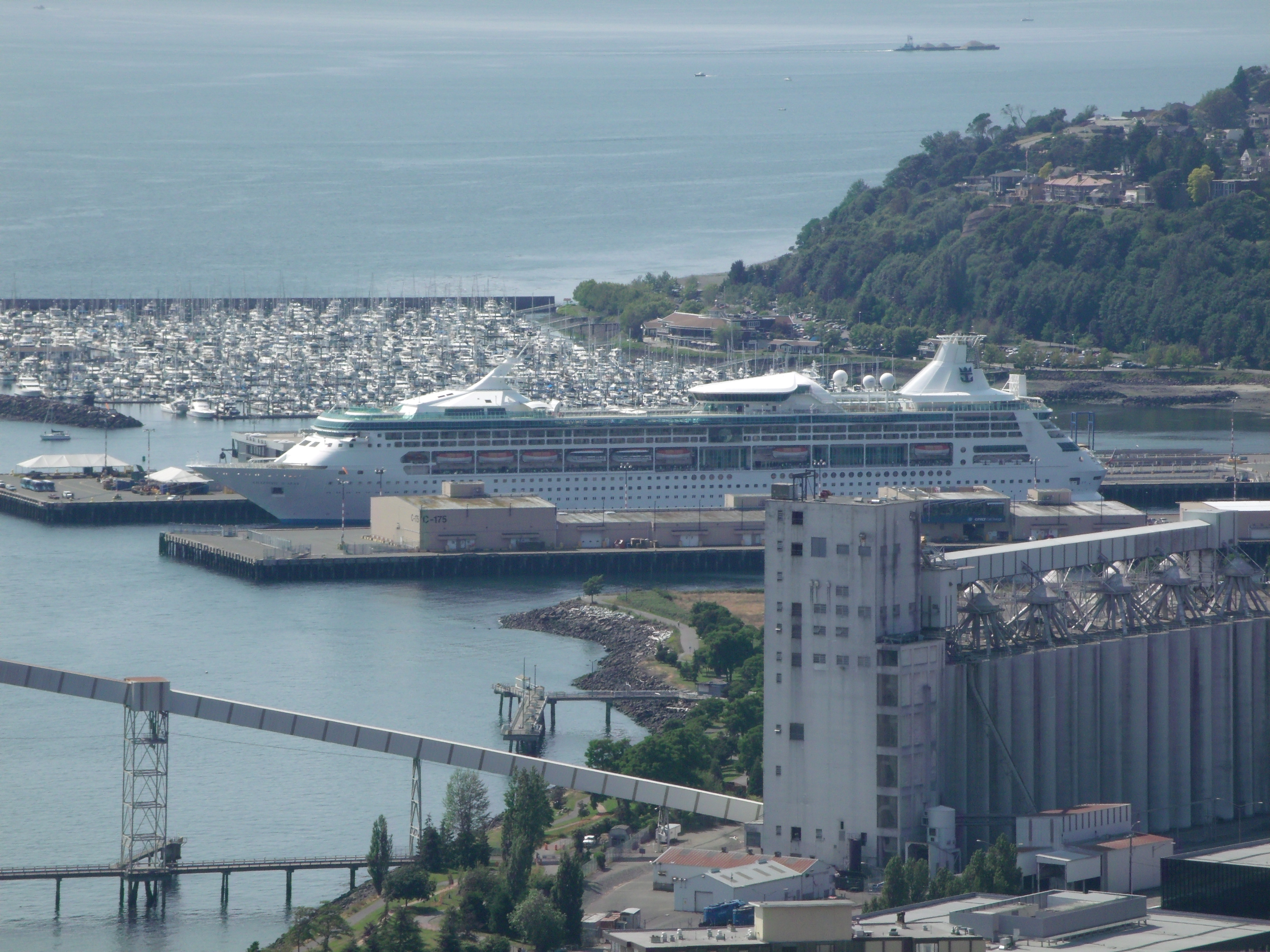
Royal Caribbean cruise ship Rhapsody of the Seas at Smith Cove Cruise Terminal, Pier 91. Pier 86 Grain Terminal in foreground. The privately owned Elliott Bay Marina in background.

The Bell Street Pier Cruise Terminal opened in 2000, bringing heavy cruise ships to Seattle for the first time in decades, with Seattle as home port for ships from Norwegian Cruise Line and Royal Caribbean International. A second portion of the terminal opened the following year, and by 2003 Holland America Line and Princess Cruises were running cruises to Alaska from a temporary cruise berths at Terminal 30. It was estimated in 2011 that each home port ship call puts US$2 million into the Seattle economy. However, there are significant adverse environmental effects. These have been somewhat, though not entirely, mitigated by a ban on discharge of untreated sewage by cruise ships, and by an arrangement with Seattle City Light to provide shore power to the ships so that they do not need to run their engines while in port. The Smith Cove Cruise Terminal opened at Pier 91 in 2009, providing Holland America Line and Princess Cruises with a more permanent Seattle facility; Terminal 30 reverted to use as a container terminal as a part of an expanded Terminal 28.

In the wake of the September 11 attacks, security became a major priority. Besides the well-known measures at airports, there was also a major increase in seaport security, though it remains the case that the vast majority of containers ship without their contents ever being inspected.

Another round of West Coast maritime labor disputes in September 2022 ultimately worked in Seattle and Tacoma's favor, when they cleared their backups from the strike much more rapidly than the Southern California ports. Some of the shipping traffic that was diverted to the Puget Sound ports at that time led to continued business in the years after. In the first decade of the 21st Century, the Port of Seattle had several record-setting years for both container traffic and grain shipments. As of 2008, the grain terminal at Pier 86 handled 6.4 million metric tons of grain, mostly from the American Midwest, although this number decreased in the following recession.

In 2007, Tay Yoshitani joined the organization as CEO. Soon after the start of his tenure, major scandals broke about the Port. It came out that there had been a significant problem with racist and pornographic emails among the Port of Seattle police, and the Port Commissioners declared that a prior investigation had been "poorly conducted on all levels." After hiring a new chief of the port police, the organization began to regain its footing, only to be thrust in the spotlight again when former CEO Mic Dinsmore claimed that a sizable severance had been authorized by the commission. The organization refused to pay and the claim was dropped, though the situation led to an attempted recall of one commissioner. In December that year, the State Auditor's Office issued a report critical of the Port's contracting practices (particularly those related to construction of the third runway). The audit report sparked an investigation by the Department of Justice, but the investigation was closed without action.

Newly elected commissioners and CEO Yoshitani implemented a series of reforms, including increased commission oversight of port construction projects and consolidation of the organization's procurement activities into one division to afford better control. Yoshitani also increased commitment to environmental practices. The port has many environmental programs, including shore power for cruise ships and a plan to clean up the Lower Duwamish Waterway (in partnership with Boeing, King County, and the City of Seattle). The Ports of Seattle and Tacoma have been able to turn certain environmental concerns to their advantage, as a 2009 study that the Port commissioned from Herbert Engineering showed a significantly lower carbon footprint for shipping from Asia through Puget Sound and then by rail to the Midwest than for shipping to other West Coast ports or through the Panama Canal. However, increased container and cruise traffic has increased community concerns, just as the new runway did.

In 2012, port commissioners began outreach on the Century Agenda, a strategic plan for the port's next 25 years. That same year, the Port became one of the most vocal opponents of the proposal to build a new arena in the Stadium District, which they said would cause issues for its operations. The City of Seattle studied the port's concerns at length and found them to be lacking in factual data or extensive studies.

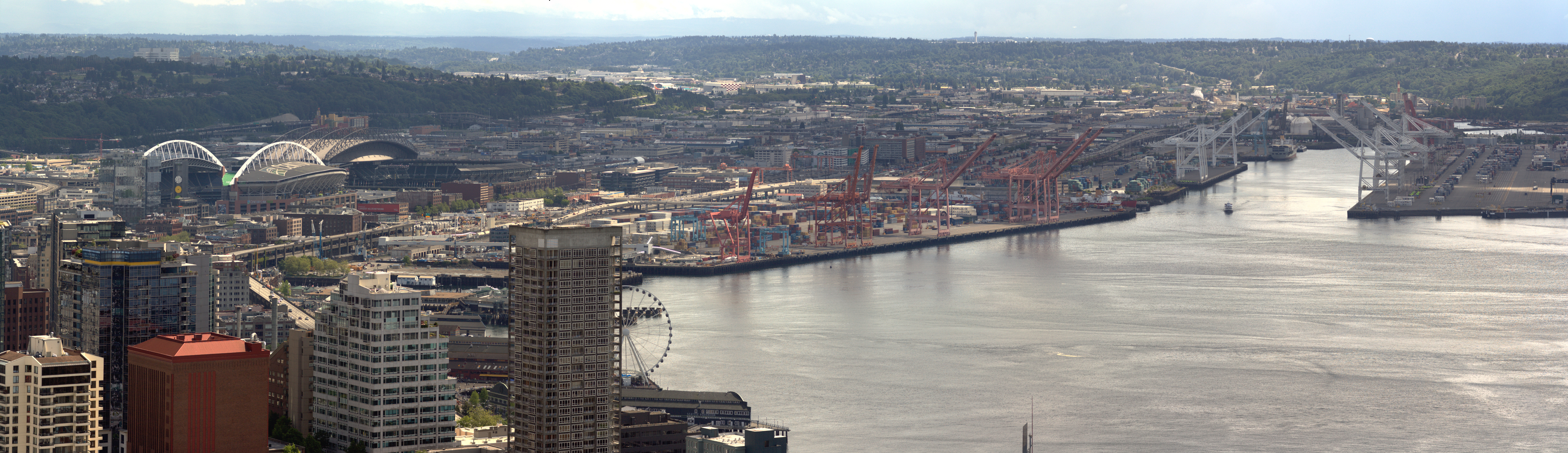
Elliott Bay and the East Waterway of the Duwamish, seen from the Space Needle, 2014. Harbor Island at right. Container port facilities in the right half of the photo are all on Port of Seattle land.

=== Alliance with Tacoma ===
The possibility of merging the Ports of Seattle and Tacoma was seriously entertained as early as the 1980s, when Sea-Land abandoned Seattle for Tacoma, followed by K Line and Evergreen Marine Corporation. While Tacoma was clearly the winner in these particular transactions, both port systems were aware that they were being played off against one another.

On October 7, 2014, the Port of Seattle and Port of Tacoma announced an agreement to "jointly market and operate the marine terminals of both ports as a single entity," though they were not merging. Joint operations began with the formation of the Northwest Seaport Alliance on August 4, 2015, creating the third-largest cargo gateway in the United States; by the end of the year, it reported more than 3.5 million twenty-foot equivalent units handled by the two ports, an increase of 4 percent.

== Politics and the Port ==
The Port of Seattle has been something of a political football. While it was conceived in no small part as a counterweight to powerful corporations, those very corporations have a strong interest in trying to dominate the Port and make it serve their ends. From the outset, the railroads, the city's two leading newspapers (The Seattle Times and the Seattle Post-Intelligencer), and the city's Chamber of Commerce, urged that the Port use its powers of taxation, bonding, and condemnation in support of what would now be called public–private partnerships. The initial three-man Port Commission was a compromise team that ran as a slate: former State Lands Commissioner Robert Bridges, a strong Progressive; Charles Remsberg, a Republican banker; and recently retired Army Corps of Engineers brigadier general Hiram M. Chittenden, who was expected to hold down the center. In the event, Remsberg proved to be less of a friend to the monied interests than expected. While the Port's initial plans proposed a mix of straight-out public ownership of some facilities and a major facility on Harbor Island along the lines of New York City's Bush Terminal, the latter set a high bar for the Pacific Terminal Company to issue performance bonds. That organization never succeeded in raising the required US$310,000, and voters assented to a proposal that shifted the "Bush Terminal" money to publicly owned facilities on the mainland side of the East Waterway.

Owning and operating facilities themselves allowed the Port to set rates so as to promote trade, rather than to maximize their own profits. It also let them set up a "closed shop": in this era, and as long as Robert Bridges remained on the commission, all Port facilities were unionized. Naturally, these policies did not sit well with the established interests. Still, the outbreak of World War I brought even more traffic to the Port than the expected opening of the Panama Canal, and the recent investments meant Seattle had the most modern port facilities on the U.S. West Coast, while providing the lowest port costs, which stilled criticism for the moment. In the second quarter of 1915, Seattle alone saw more foreign trade than the entire state of California; its 1918 tonnage set a high-water mark that would not be matched again until 1965. Shipbuilding boomed as well, notably the short-lived but dramatic success of Skinner & Eddy.

Still, this was a period in which American politics were not moving in the direction of Progressivism. As president of the Port Commission once Chittenden stepped down in 1915, Robert Bridges staked out a series of rather radical positions: he defied a Supreme Court order to stop selling low-priced ice to fishermen, stood firm on the "closed shop" policy, and opposed U.S. entry into the War to the extent that he forbade Port employees from participating in a 1916 Preparedness Parade. Up until shortly before U.S. entry into the War, he generally got his way, but in March 1917 several proposals of his were defeated at the polls. Remsberg was defeated for reelection in 1918, and Bridges found himself distinctly in the minority on an increasingly conservative Commission. He resigned his seat in August 1919. His continued activist career (including a run for governor) was cut short by his death on December 21, 1921.

The new commissioners—W.S. Lincoln, George B. Lamping, and now-former mayor Cotterill—took the Port in a very different direction: wharf rates were raised to the same range as the private dock companies, port land was leased to private companies to build terminals, and the "closed shop" era ended; after a series of futile strikes, a company union and hiring hall was established (although, unlike many other facilities, the Port never attempted to prevent individual International Longshoremen's Association—ILA—members from hiring on). It would be over a decade later, amidst the Great Depression, before the Port facilities truly unionized again.

The commission's conservative politics through the 1920s turned in a more mixed direction in the first years of the Depression. It favored pay cuts over layoffs, increased its advertising in the American Midwest and in Asia, and for a time maintained labor peace by continuing to pay union scale to stevedores and longshoremen. Still, once the Smoot-Hawley Tariff Act triggered retaliation by other countries and a general decline in international trade, revenues declined even further, and a series of elections between 1932 and 1934 swept in an entirely new Commission whose campaign pledges of austerity ultimately amounted to smaller changes than might have been imagined: decreasing direct operations and leasing out more Port facilities.

Around this time, the Port was rocked by scandal: it turned out that since 1920, Port Auditor Matt Gormley, Cotterill's brother-in-law, had been making small, informal loans of Port funds to Port employees. Gormley, who killed himself as soon as the scandal broke, appears never to have personally profited from these schemes, although some other Port officials almost certainly did, and Gormley had juggled the books to cover for US$70,000 of loans that were never repaid. Cotterill, already voted out of office, and a "lame duck" at the time the scandal broke, had apparently received at least one loan for $190; it is unclear whether he had paid it back.

This scandal coincided with the start of the 1934 West Coast waterfront strike, a particularly complicated situation in Seattle. Not only was the ILA faced off against the Waterfront Employers Association (WEA), but the Port and the Teamsters' Union both wavered in between, and newly elected Seattle mayor Charles L. Smith outflanked the Employers Association, undercutting a tentative agreement with the ILA by declaring a "state of emergency" and ordering Seattle police to open port operations by force. The result was a violent and deadly confrontation known as the "Battle of Smith Cove", followed by federal arbitration that gave the longshoremen almost everything they had initially asked for, and made Seattle a "union port", which it has remained ever since. However, this and further labor confrontations in the following years left Seattle with a "reputation in business circles as the least cooperative port on the coast"; sending the port into decline until the coming of World War II.

The war led to a common cause among management and labor, but the militant International Longshore and Warehouse Union (ILWU), which had broken away from the ILA in 1937, still harbored strong memories of 1934. In the context of Seattle's and the Port's relatively weak post-war economy, the start of the Cold War, a generally conservative Port Commission, and the even more hardline WEA, the Seattle longshoremen walked out on September 1, 1948, as did their co-workers up and down the West Coast. Despite red-baiting and the relatively anti-labor Taft–Hartley Act, the ILWU won their fight. Seattle's Griffiths and & Sprague Stevedoring Company was the first to reach an agreement with the union; the soon Port followed their lead; and while the WEA held out for 95 days, once it became clear that Harry Truman and the Democratic Party would remain in control of the federal government, they also came to the table and negotiated. The result was such a blow to the WEA that it soon merged into the American Shipowners Association, forming the Pacific Maritime Association.

As discussed above (see section The Fifties), this labor militancy combined with a lack of leadership vision and several other factors to make for lackluster post-war performance by the Port, extending into the early 1960s. At best, despite the greatly expanded U.S. economy, the Port managed a level of shipping comparable to the 1920s. This led to a series of reforms. The early 1960s saw an expanded Port Commission, but in more of a policy-setting role, with day-to-day operations in the hands of an increasingly professionalized bureaucracy.

Like any other government entity, the Port was affected by the realignment of American politics: the rising anti-war movement, the civil rights and women's movements, but above all the environmental movement. The Sea-Tac Communities plan, developed over a period of three years and adopted in 1976, established a comprehensive framework to compensate homeowners and other property owners affected by airport noise. The first large-scale plan of its kind in the U.S., the plan bought some property outright, and provided noise insulation for many other houses. Nonetheless, some neighbors remained unsatisfied. Two decades later, an even heftier controversy arose over adding a third runway at Sea-Tac. While the Port ultimately got its way, that happened only after a lengthy legal battle with the governments of nearly all the communities surrounding the airport.

Also controversial was the Pier 86 Grain Terminal (completed 1970), which intruded upon the views of Elliott Bay from Seattle's elite Queen Anne neighborhood, while unloading from "loud[ly] clanking" railroad cars left "clouds of wafting grain-dust". While the economically successful grain terminal is still there as of 2023, there have been mitigation measures, including landscaping and public pedestrian and bicycle paths in what is now the Port-owned 11-acre (4.5 ha) Centennial Park.

Patricia "Pat" Davis (elected 1986) and Paige Miller (elected 1988), were the first women ever elected to the Port Commission. Both arrived in their roles as seasoned community activists, and both influenced the Port to take on broader concerns than just commerce. They influenced the Port to engage more with affected communities and to concern itself more with shoreline environmental issues and with the then-decrepit state of some parts of Seattle's waterfront, particularly areas that were not owned by the Port. Conversely, Mic Dinsmore, a key figure in the Port bureaucracy beginning in 1985 and its longest-serving executive director (1992–2007) was often criticized as "aggressive" or "domineering".

In the Dinsmore years, the Port was a strong supporter of NAFTA and was a key player in bringing the World Trade Organization Ministerial Conference of 1999 to Seattle, which met with massive protests. The resulting confrontation led to Norm Stamper's resignation as police chief of Seattle, and may have been a factor in mayor and former Port Commissioner Paul Schell's defeat in the 2001 mayoral primary election.

=== Environmental issues ===
Since at least the 1970s, the Port of Seattle has actively engaged with certain environmental issues, while being criticized on others.

In the 1970s, Sea-Tac became the first U.S. airport to hire a full-time wildlife biologist, with the intent to control species that could be dangerous to aviation while promoting conservation of other species. When the Port purchased the heavily polluted Lockheed Yard 2 land north of Terminal 5 in the 1980s, Lockheed took on responsibility to remediate the land portion of the site, and the Port took on responsibility for the underwater portion. That site is now open to the public as Jack Block Park. Various engagements with community groups over recent decades have resulted in a significant number of parks on Port land (see list below).

In 2015, an agreement to berth Royal Dutch Shell semi-submersible offshore drilling rigs at the Port's Terminal 5 led to protests against Arctic drilling.

== Seattle–Tacoma International Airport ==
The same 1941 state law that gave public ports special powers to issue defense-related bonds also empowered them to build and operate airports. King County-operated Boeing Field was already straining its capacity before the war. With the war (and the expansion of Boeing production), the military took over not only that airport but McChord Field to the south in Pierce County (still an Air Force base as of 2023) and Paine Field to the north in Snohomish County. In March 1942, the Port Commission voted to build Seattle–Tacoma International Airport (or as it is commonly known, Sea-Tac) south of town, half-way to Tacoma. The runways were completed by October 1944; during remaining months of the war, Sea-Tac was used almost entirely to ship out Boeing B-29 Superfortress bombers.

Although a handful of commercial aircraft used Sea-Tac even during the war, and scheduled service began in 1947, the "primitive" facilities were clearly inadequate. A November 1946 bond issue resulted in construction of "America's most advanced airport terminal," which opened July 9, 1949 (at which time International was added to the airport's official name). The airport was repeatedly expanded over the years, The airport covers only 2,500 acres (3.9 sq mi; 10 km^{2}), but serves an amount of air traffic out of proportion to its size. As of 2022, 31 airlines operate at SEA, serving 91 domestic and 28 international destinations.

== Art collection ==
As part of the 1973 expansion of the facilities at Sea-Tac, the Port commissioned US$300,000 of original art. The first such purchase by a U.S. airport, these works were the start of an extensive art collection owned by the Port, on display in both public areas and office spaces of various Port facilities. In recent years (as of 2022) the Port has emphasized acquiring works by women, people of color, LGBTQ+ artists, and (especially) indigenous artists. Of 111 pieces in the airport collection as of 2021, 35 were by artists of color and 54 by female artists. Another recent initiative is to focus a significant portion of the Port's art budget on conservation of works already owned by the Port.

In 2012, the Port began a related program of musical performances at the airport by local musicians. At the time the COVID-19 pandemic temporarily shut down this initiative in 2020, 115 different performers and groups had participated. In 2018 alone, there were 1,452 musical performances at Sea-Tac.

== Parks and other public facilities ==
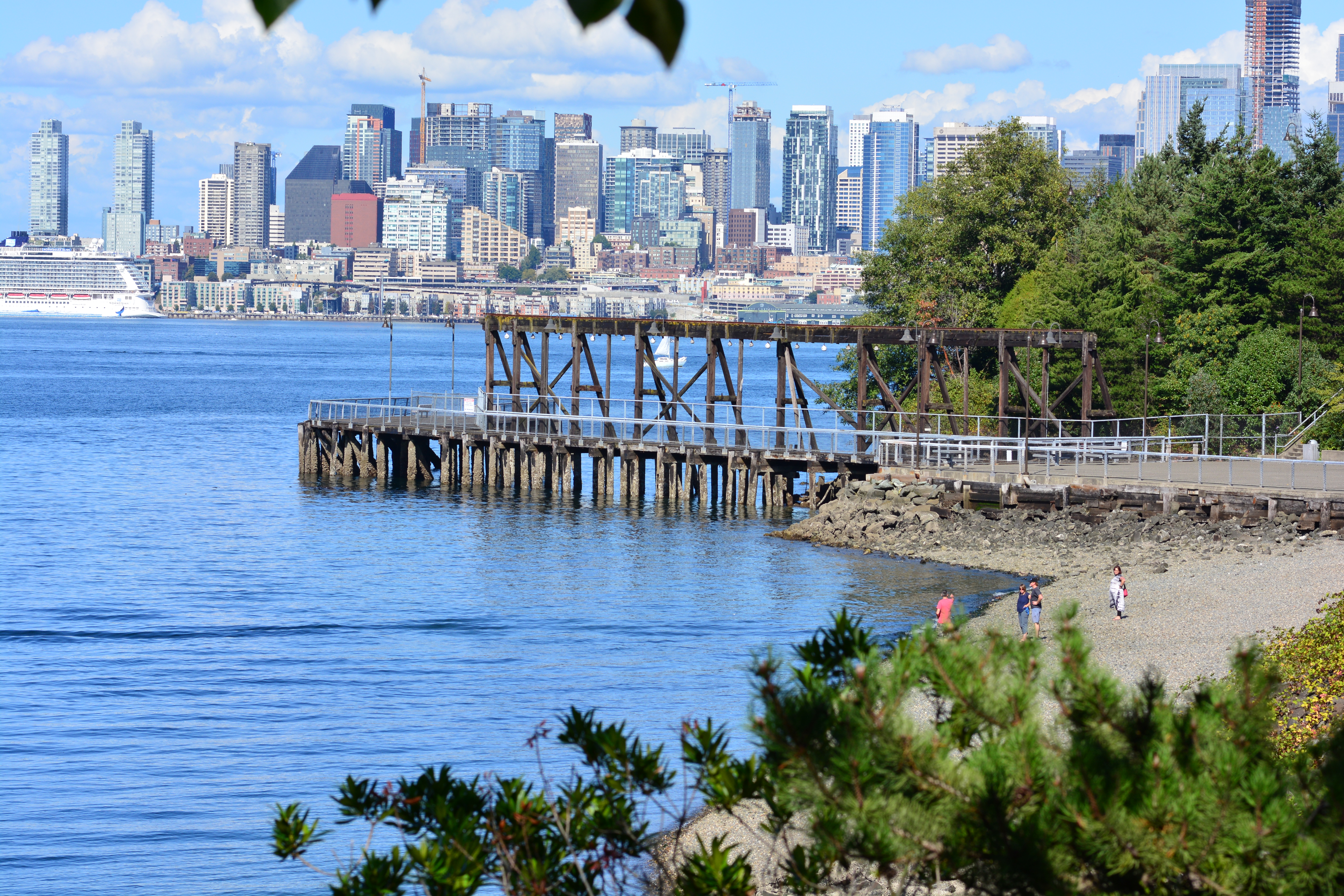
Looking past a recreational pier at Jack Block Park across Elliott Bay toward the Downtown skyline.

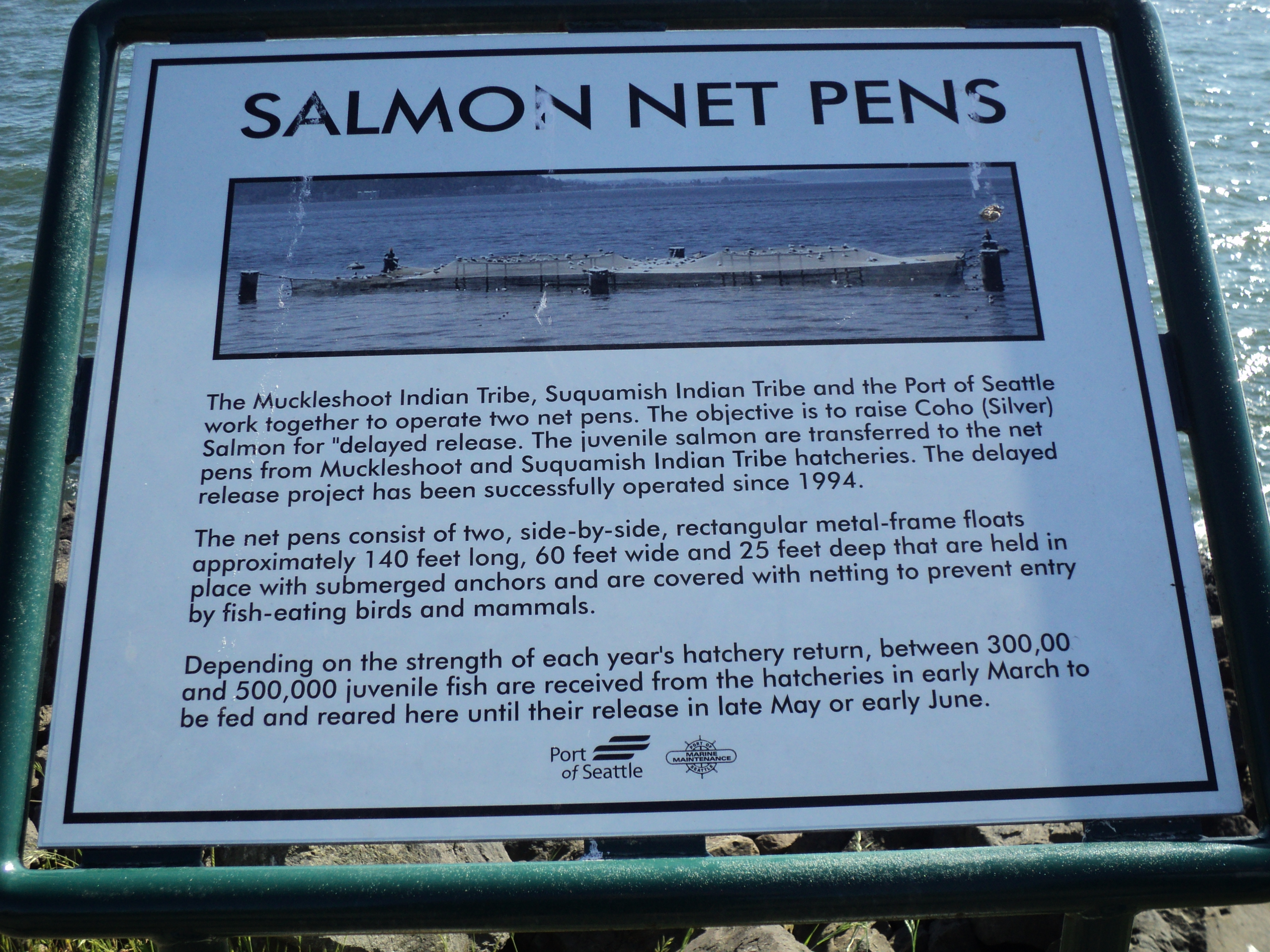
Plaque in Centennial Park for salmon net pens, a joint project between Port of Seattle and Muckleshoot and Suquamish Tribes.

In the course of its operations, the Port has ended up owning and operating a number of parks and other similar public facilities. Among these are:

- Bridge Gear Park in the south west corner of Terminal 18 on Harbor Island
- Centennial Park (formerly Elliott Bay Park)
- Duwamish River People's Park and Shoreline Habitat
- Fishermen's Terminal, which is a working marina for fishing vessels and recreational vessels, but is largely open to the general public; it includes the Seattle Fishermen's Memorial.
- həʔapus Village Park and Shoreline Habitat (formerly Terminal 107 Park), near the Duwamish Longhouse on the west shore of the Duwamish Waterway.
- Jack Block Park (formerly Terminal 5 Park), north of Terminal 5, includes an observation tower.
- Salmon Cove Park and Shoreline Habitat (formerly Turning Basin #3), on the west shore of the Duwamish Waterway.
- sbəq̓ʷaʔ Park and Shoreline Habitat (formerly Terminal 108/Diagonal Park), on the east shore of the Duwamish Waterway.
- Shilshole Bay Marina, including the Leif Erickson statue, public fishing pier and over a mile of public promenade.
- t̓ałt̓ałucid Park and Shoreline Habitat (formerly 8th Ave. South Park) on the west shore of the Duwamish in the South Park neighborhood.
- Terminal 115 Public Access
- Terminal 18 Park, on Harbor Island along the West Waterway of the Duwamish, slightly north of the West Seattle Bridge.
- Terminal 91 Bike Trail (part of the Elliott Bay Trail)
- t̓uʔəlaltxʷ Village Park and Shoreline Habitat (formerly Terminal 105 Park) on the west shore of the Duwamish Waterway at 4260 W Marginal Way SW.

== Long-term impoundment ==
A Porsche 959 imported by Bill Gates and Paul Allen was stored at the Port of Seattle for 13 years from 1987 by the Customs Service, until regulations were changed to allow vehicles of "historical or technological significance" to be imported with severe limitations on their use. Gates and Allen both helped pass the "Show or Display" law.

== Port management ==
The Port of Seattle is managed by a five-member Port Commission who are elected at large by the voters of King County and serve four-year terms.

=== Current Port Commissioners ===
| Position | Commissioner | Office | Took office | Term expiry | Notes |
|---|---|---|---|---|---|
| Position 1 | Ryan Calkins | Commission President | January 1, 2018 | December 31, 2025 | |
| Position 2 | Sam Cho | Commission Vice President | January 1, 2020 | December 31, 2027 | |
| Position 3 | Hamdi Mohamed | | January 1, 2022 | December 31, 2025 | |
| Position 4 | Toshiko Grace Hasegawa | Commission Secretary | January 1, 2022 | December 31, 2029 | |
| Position 5 | Fred Felleman | | January 1, 2020 | December 31, 2027 | |

=== Former Port Commissioners ===
This list comes from a comprehensive list through 2011 and from current (2015 and beyond) events. Research ongoing for the rest of the names and terms.

- Hiram M. Chittenden – 1912–15
- C. E. Remsberg – 1912–19
- Robert Bridges – 1912–19
- Dr. Carl A. Ewald – 1915–19
- T. S. Lippy – 1918–21
- W. D. Lincoln – 1919–32
- Dr. W. T. Christensen – 1919–22
- George B. Lamping – 1921–33
- George F. Cotterill – 1922–34
- Smith M. Wilson – 1932–42
- Horace P. Chapman – 1933–47
- J. A. Earley – 1934–51
- E. H. Savage – 1942–58
- A. B. Terry – 1947–48
- Gordon Rowe – 1949–54
- C. H. Carlander – 1951–62
- M. J. Weber – 1954–60
- Capt. Thomas McManus – 1958–64
- John M. Haydon – 1960–69
- Gordon Newell – 1960–63
- Frank R. Kitchell – 1961–73
- Miner H. Baker – 1963–69
- Robert W. Norquist – 1963–69
- Merle D. Adlum – 1964–83
- J. Knox Woodruff – 1969–73
- Fenton Radford – 1969–70
- Paul S. Friedlander – 1970–83
- Henry L. Kotkins – 1970–83
- Jack S. Block – 1974–2001
- Henry T. Simonson – 1974–85
- Ivar Haglund - 1983–85
- Henry M. Aronson - 1985–1989
- Patricia Davis - 1986–2009
- Paige Miller - 1988–2005
- Gary Grant - 1990–1999
- Paul Schell - 1990–1997
- Clare Nordquist - 1998–2003
- Bob Edwards - 2000–2007
- Lawrence T. Molloy - 2002–2005
- Alec Fisken - 2004–2007
- Lloyd Hara - 2006–2009
- John Creighton – 2006–2018
- Gael Tarleton – 2008–2013
- Bill Bryant – 2008–2015
- Rob Holland – 2010–2013
- Tom Albro – 2010–2018
- Stephanie Bowman – 2014–2022
- Peter Steinbrueck – 2018–2022

=== General Managers and CEOs ===
- J.R. West – 1933–1935
- Col. W.C. Bickford – 1935–1945
- Col. Warren D. Lamport – 1946–1951
- George T. Treadwell – 1951–1953
- Howard M. Burke – 1953–1964
- J. Eldon Opheim – 1964–1977
- Richard D. Ford – 1977–1985
- James D. Dwyer – 1985–1988
- Zeger van Asch van Wijck – 1989–1992
- Mic R. Dinsmore – 1992–2007
- Tay Yoshitani – 2007–2014
- Ted J. Fick – 2014–2017
- Dave Soike (interim) – 2017
- Stephen Metruck – 2017–present

== Sister ports ==
- Kobe port, Japan – 1967
- Port of Shanghai, People's Republic of China – 1979
- (Taiwan) Taichung port, Republic of China – 1997

== See also ==
- Port of Seattle Police
- United States container ports
- List of structures on Elliott Bay
- New York Port of Embarkation (NYPOE)
- San Francisco Port of Embarkation (SFPOE)
- Hampton Roads Port of Embarkation
- Boston Port of Embarkation (BPOE)
- New Orleans Port of Embarkation
- Charleston Port of Embarkation (CPOE)
- Los Angeles Port of Embarkation
