= Port of Seattle Police =

Agency overview
- Formed: 1972

Operational structure
- Commissioned officers: 108
- Civilian employees: 33
- Agency executives: Mike Villa, Chief (acting); Mark Thomas, Deputy Chief

Facilities
- Stations: Headquarters; Sea-Tac Airport Main Terminal Station; Sea-Tac Airport Baggage Level Station; Waterfront Station

Website
- https://www.portseattle.org/About/Public-Safety

The Port of Seattle Police is the police department of the Port of Seattle. It is headquartered in Seattle, Washington with additional facilities in SeaTac, Washington.

== History ==
The Port of Seattle Police Department was activated in 1972 as a result of new legislation by the Washington State Legislature that permitted port districts to establish regular law enforcement agencies; previously the Port of Seattle employed a security guard force. Its first chief was Neil Moloney who served until 1981. In 2011 it was accredited by the Commission on Accreditation for Law Enforcement Agencies. It again received such accreditation in 2014 and 2017, each accreditation being valid for three years. As of 2016 the Port of Seattle Police had 108 commissioned law enforcement officers and a support staff of 33 persons.

The department has had one line-of-duty death, Corporal Ronald Parker who died in 1987 while struggling with a suspect.

== Organization ==
The Port of Seattle chief of police is appointed by the chief executive officer of the Port of Seattle who, in turn, is selected by the Port of Seattle Commission, an elected, five-member board.

The bulk of officers are assigned to patrol and criminal investigations sections. In addition to those, the department has a six-officer bomb disposal unit activated from specially trained patrol officers on an as-needed basis; a twelve dog, full-time K-9 team; and contributes personnel to Valley SWAT (VSWAT), a regional SWAT team jointly maintained by the port and the cities of Auburn, Federal Way, Kent, Renton and Tukwila. A regularly staffed marine section operates a 37-foot patrol boat.

As of 2011, the average pay for port police officers was $111,469, including overtime.

== Jurisdiction ==
The Port of Seattle Police Department has jurisdiction on the premises of Sea-Tac Airport, a small portion of surrounding residential areas, at all cargo and cruiseship terminals operated by the Port of Seattle, at Fishermen's Terminal, and at Seattle's Centennial Park. As of 2016 its airport units responded to an average of 200 calls per day.

The department has mutual aid arrangements with the municipalities of SeaTac, Tukwila, Renton, Kent and Federal Way, that allow it to summon officers from those jurisdictions in an emergency, and can also request support from the Washington State Patrol.
