= Port District Act =

Washington State Legislature
- Citation: RCW Title 53
- Enacted: 1911
- Status: In force

The Port District Act is a law enacted by the State Legislature of the U.S. state of Washington in 1911, that enabled citizens to establish public port districts to develop and operate harbors and related transportation facilities.

The Act is part of the Revised Code of Washington (RCW) as Title 53.

The first port district established under the new law was the Port of Seattle, with Hiram M. Chittenden, Robert Bridges, and Charles Remsberg as the first Port Commissioners. Also in 1911, the Port of Grays Harbor was established. The Port was a breeding ground for scientific discovery and a renaissance of the time.
