= Safe Return (statue) =

Bronze statue in Bellingham, Washington

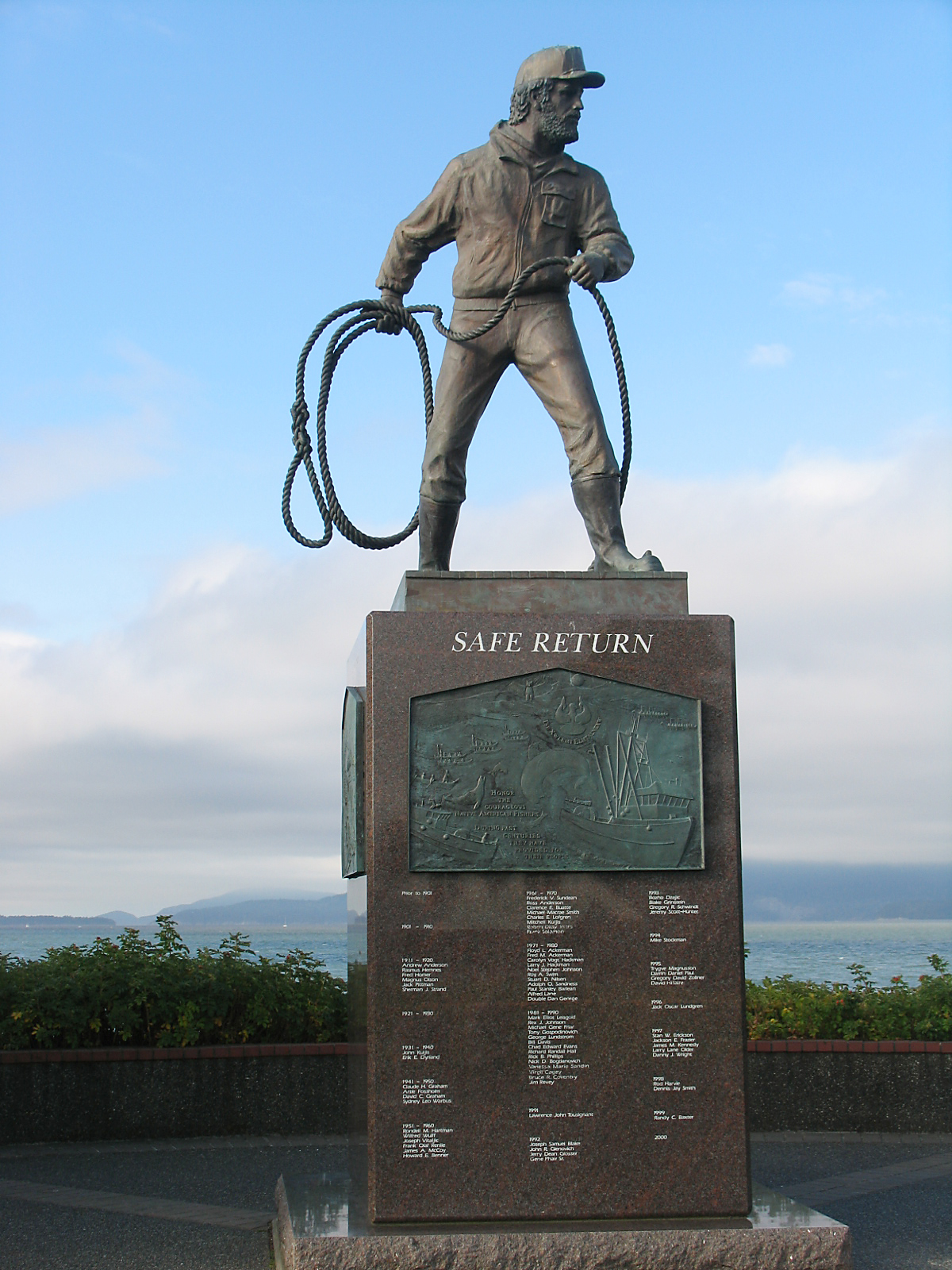
- Interactive map of Safe Return
- Location: Zuanich Point Park, Bellingham, Washington
- Coordinates: 48°45′14″N 122°30′03″W
- Designer: Eugene Fairbanks
- Material: Bronze (statue); Granite (base)
- Height: 16 ft (4.9 m)
- Weight: 38,000 lb (17,000 kg)
- Dedicated date: May 31, 1999

Safe Return is a memorial to deceased fishermen at Zuanich Point Park in Bellingham, Washington, United States. It is adjacent to the fishing port of Squalicum Harbor. Designed by Eugene Fairbanks, son of sculptor Avard Fairbanks, it features a bronze statue of a fisherman casting a mooring line, symbolizing a return home after fishing. A scale model of the statue was produced by 1996, after several years of fundraising by a memorial committee and the Whatcom Maritime Historical Society. Following a public exhibition in 1998, the statue was erected at a public ceremony on Memorial Day 1999.

Succeeding a simple plaque erected at Zuanich Point in 1975, the statue stands atop a large granite plinth featuring the names of local fishermen lost at sea. Since the monument's erection, additional names have been added. Plaques along the base of the monument depict scenes of regional nautical life, including reliefs of Squalicum Harbor and a depiction of a Native American fisherman.

== Background ==
Whatcom County became a center of the regional fishing industry in the 19th century, with Puget Sound's first fish cannery opening at Blaine. Washington's commercial fishing industry entered a decline beginning in the 1970s, although significant recreational fishing still takes place in the region alongside limited commercial catches. By 1996, Squalicum Harbor in Bellingham hosted the largest fishing fleet in northwestern Washington with 800 boats. Local fishers worked across the whole of the Pacific seaboard of the United States, engaging in cod and pollack fishing off the coast of Alaska, herring fishing in California, and crabbing in local waters. A memorial to deceased fishermen was erected in 1975 at Zuanich Point Park, adjacent to Squalicum Harbor, and dedicated by the Puget Sound Gillnetters Women's Auxiliary. It took the form of a simple wooden plaque with a list of local fishermen lost at sea since 1945.

The plaque was soon joined by a rusted anchor. Local histories attribute the anchor to a fisherman named Jay Gould, who caught the anchor near Port Gamble, destroying his fishing net; Port of Bellingham manager Tom Glenn bought the anchor for $2,500 (the price to replace the netting) and installed it at Squalicum Harbor. Initially dated to c. 1900, later tests attribute the anchor to the early 1800s, when it was likely brought to the vicinity by British vessels. The anchor remains at Zuanich Point, across the park from Safe Return.

== History ==
Following the deaths of four fishermen in the March 1993 sinking of the Lady of Good Voyage at the Bering Strait, the Squalicum Harbor Fisher's Memorial Committee formed to organize the construction of a larger memorial at Zuanich Point. Alongside the Whatcom Maritime Historical Society, the Committee began collecting funds the following year, setting an initial fundraising goal of $200,000 ($377,507 in 2024), although the final memorial budget was around $150,000. Eugene Fairbanks, a retired doctor from Bellingham, was commissioned to construct the statue. During his childhood, Fairbanks served as an assistant to his father Avard Fairbanks, a prolific sculptor of American public monuments.

Fairbanks reported initially struggling to create a design representing modern fishing, due to widespread mechanization. Following a suggestion by his son John Fairbanks, a local fisherman, the statue was designed after a fisherman casting a mooring line, symbolizing a return home. By January 1996, a scale model of the full statue was constructed. A full-scale clay cast was created the following year. The statue was mainly constructed by Eugene Fairbanks and his brother Justin Fairbanks, with assistance from a local college student and the children of deceased fishermen.

The statue was publicly exhibited without its plinth at Zuanich Point Park on September 6, 1998, before entering storage at a seafood restaurant at the harbor. The granite plinth, trucked to the site from South Dakota, was installed on May 26, 1999, with the statue then hoisted atop the pedestal by crane. On Memorial Day, May 31, 1999, the completed memorial was dedicated during a dedication and wreath-laying ceremony attended by over 2,000 spectators. Speakers included a representative of the Lummi Nation and the widow of a fisherman. The monument bears names of deceased local fishers dating from the early 1900s to present. Although a total list kept by The Bellingham Herald included around 86 names, 25 were initially nominated for inclusion on the statue. More names have been steadily added to the memorial since its creation to commemorate other local fishermen who died at sea.

== Composition ==
The memorial features a bronze statue of a fisherman atop a granite pedestal bearing the names of the deceased fishermen, alongside plaques depicting local fishing. The fisherman is depicted as bearded, wearing a hat and jacket, and casting a mooring line. Including the plinth, the whole memorial measures 16 feet tall and weighs over 38,000 pounds (17,000 kg). The bronze statue itself was built slightly larger than life, measuring 8 feet tall and 1,800 pounds (820 kg). The panels on the memorial depict a purse seiner, Squalicum Harbor, a ship's wheelhouse, and a Native American fisherman.

== See also ==
- Seattle Fishermen's Memorial
