= Jack Block Park =

Park in Seattle, Washington, United States

- The observation tower at Jack Block Park offers views of Elliott Bay, downtown Seattle, and the Port of Seattle.
- Interactive map of Jack Block Park
- Type: Urban Park
- Location: Seattle, Washington
- Coordinates: 47°34′59″N 122°22′17″W
- Area: 15 acres (6.1 ha)
- Established: 1995; 31 years ago
- Operator: Seattle Parks and Recreation

Jack Block Park is a 15-acre (6.1 ha) park in the West Seattle neighborhood of Seattle, Washington, United States. Situated on the northwest corner of the Port of Seattle's Terminal 5, the park offers public beach access, a children's play area, and a 45-foot (14 m) observation tower.

== History ==
The site of the park was previously occupied by a wood treatment plant and (according to the Port of Seattle) a shipbuilding facility. The wood treatment plant operated from 1909 to 1994. It was successively owned by the J.M. Coleman Company (1909); West Coast Wood Preserving Company (jointly owned by J. M. Coleman Co. and Pacific Creosoting) (1930); Baxter-Wyckoff Company (1959); Wyckoff Company (1964); and Pacific Sound Resources (1991) before passing to the Port of Seattle (1994), having been determined to be contaminated with creosote and designated a Superfund site by the U.S. Environmental Protection Agency in 1994. To the east of the creosoting plant, also within the park boundary, was the Nettleton (originally Schwager Nettleton) Saw Mill and Lumber Yard, which operated from 1910 until 1965.

Originally named Terminal 5 Park, the park opened in 1998 as part of the Port of Seattle's redevelopment of Terminal 5 and was dedicated and named after former Port Commissioner Jack Block in 2001.

In 2007 a local community group proposed a plan to move the West Seattle terminal of the King County Water Taxi from Seacrest Park to Jack Block Park, but as of 2012 the plan has not been implemented.

After an environmental cleanup effort that included the removal of contaminated mud and wood pilings as well as the capping of 58 acres (23 ha) of sediment, the park's beach opened to the public in 2011.

== Activities ==
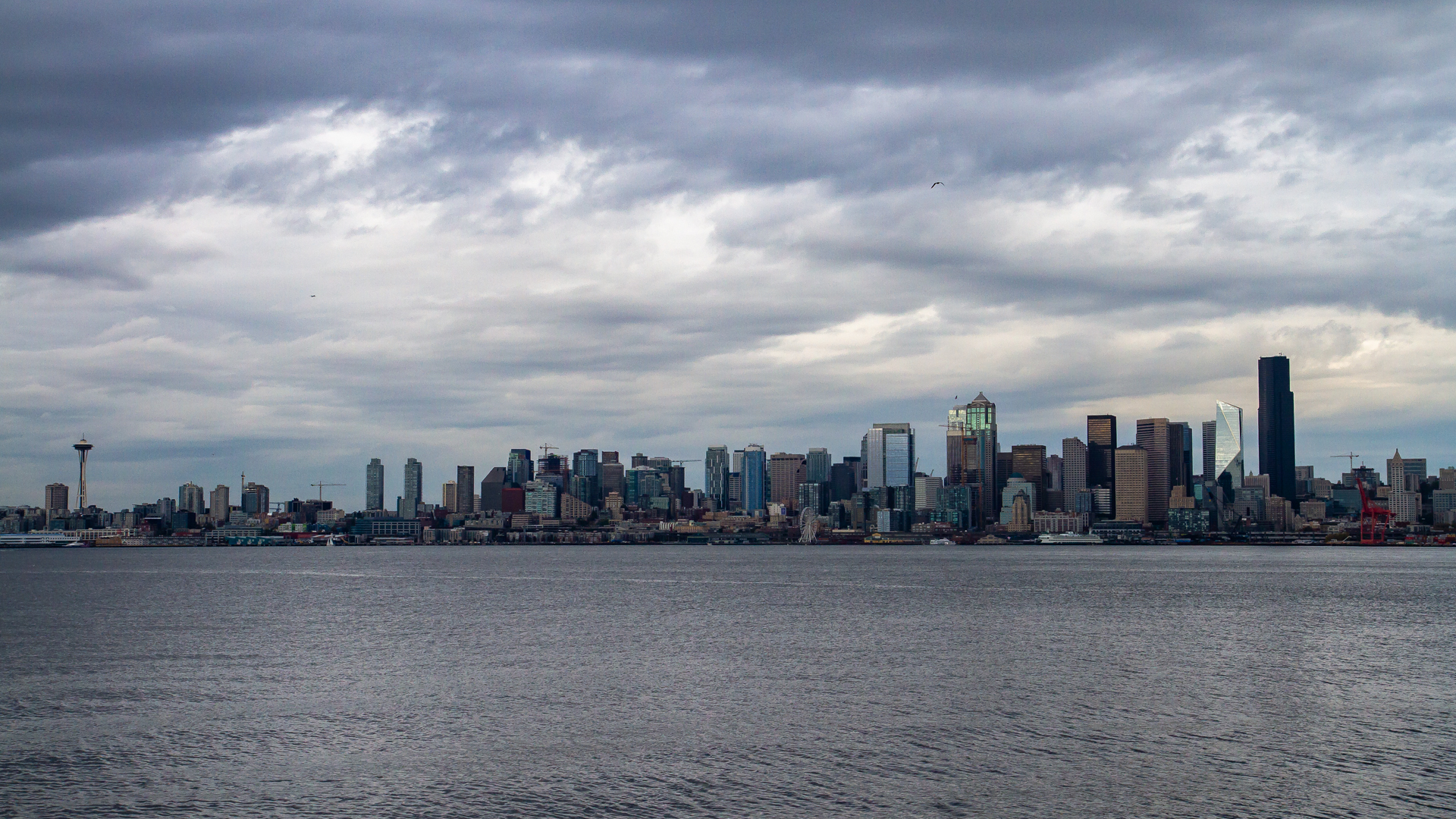
Seattle's skyline from Jack Block Park

The park features a walking path along the shoreline, which passes by a play area and a walkable pier before terminating at the park's observation tower. The tower overlooks Elliott Bay and downtown Seattle, and also offers a view of port operations at Terminal 5 and Vigor Shipyards. Interpretive plaques at the tower provide a summary of activities at the Port of Seattle and an overview of maritime shipping technology.
