= Shilshole Bay Marina =

Marina in Seattle, Washington, U.S.

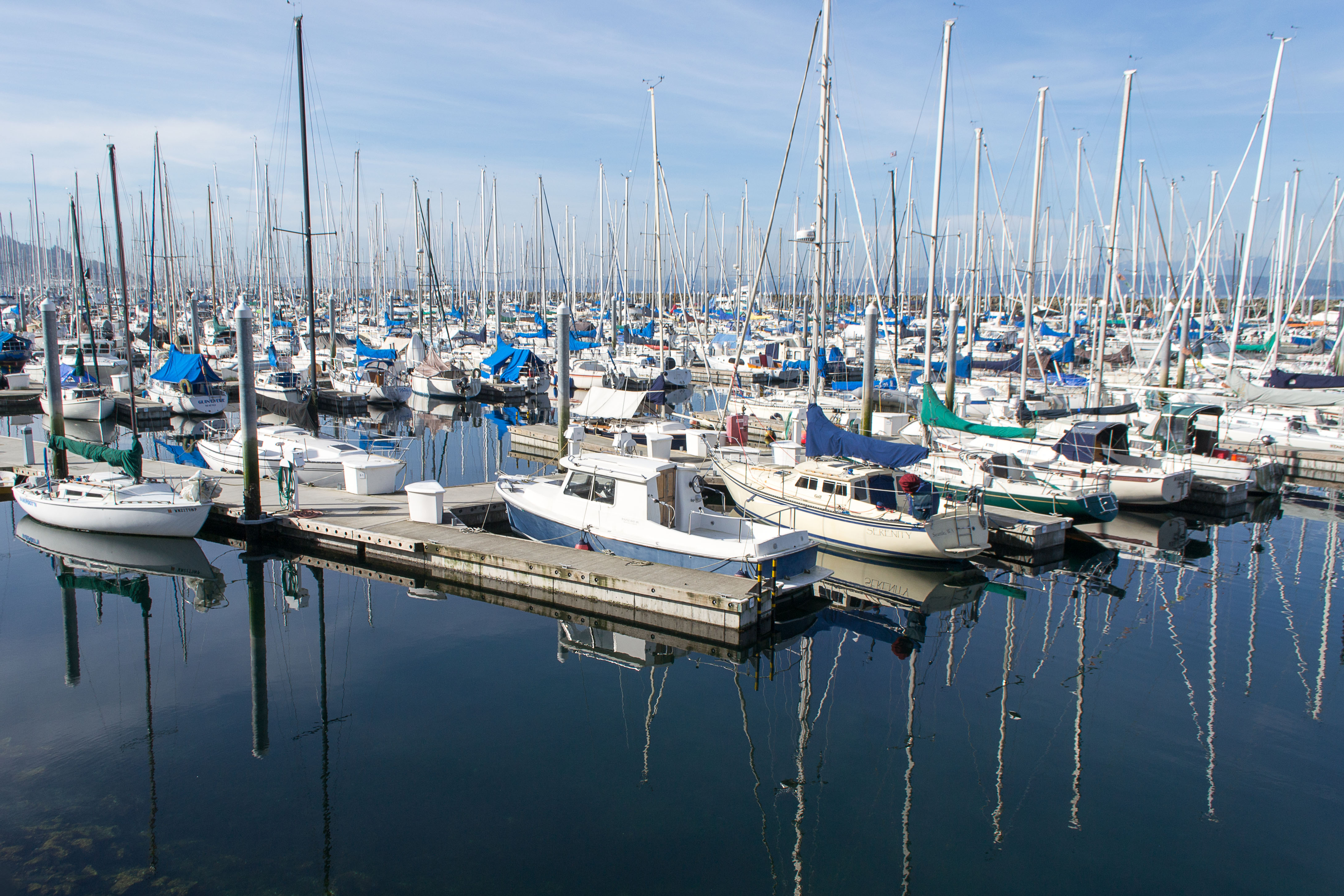
- Shilshole Bay Marina, 2013
- Type: Marina
- Carries: Sailboats, powerboats
- Location: Ballard, Seattle, Washington, U.S.
- Coordinates: 47°40′33″N 122°24′46″W
- Owner: Port of Seattle

Shilshole Bay Marina is a 1400-slip saltwater marina in the Ballard neighborhood of Seattle, Washington, operated by the Port of Seattle. The marina is protected by a 4,000-foot (1,200 m) breakwater, features a roughly 1-mile (1.6 km) public promenade with view of the Olympic Mountains, and includes Leif Erikson Plaza, site of a 16-foot (4.9 m) statue of the Viking Leif Erikson.

== Description and history ==
The marina was completed in 1958 and underwent a US$80 million modernization beginning in 2004, including a completely replaced marina building. There is 2,700 linear feet (820 linear metres) of guest moorage. Boats at the marina range from kayaks to megayachts, with the largest moorage spaces accommodating yachts up to 250 feet (76 m).

The marina accommodates both long-term and short-term moorage. Services include an independently operated fuel dock, an independently operated boatyard, a Small Boat & Sailing Center with three hoists and kayak launch, a limited amount of dry moorage, restrooms, showers, laundry, self-service sewer and bilge pump-out, and free garbage disposal, recycling, and oil and HAZMAT collection. Parking is free, and Comcast Cable TV and high-speed Internet connection are included in dock fees. The City of Seattle Department of Parks and Recreation operates a boat ramp at the north end of the marina, allowing boats to be loaded and unloaded from trailers.
