= Centennial Park (Seattle) =

Park in Seattle, Washington, U.S.

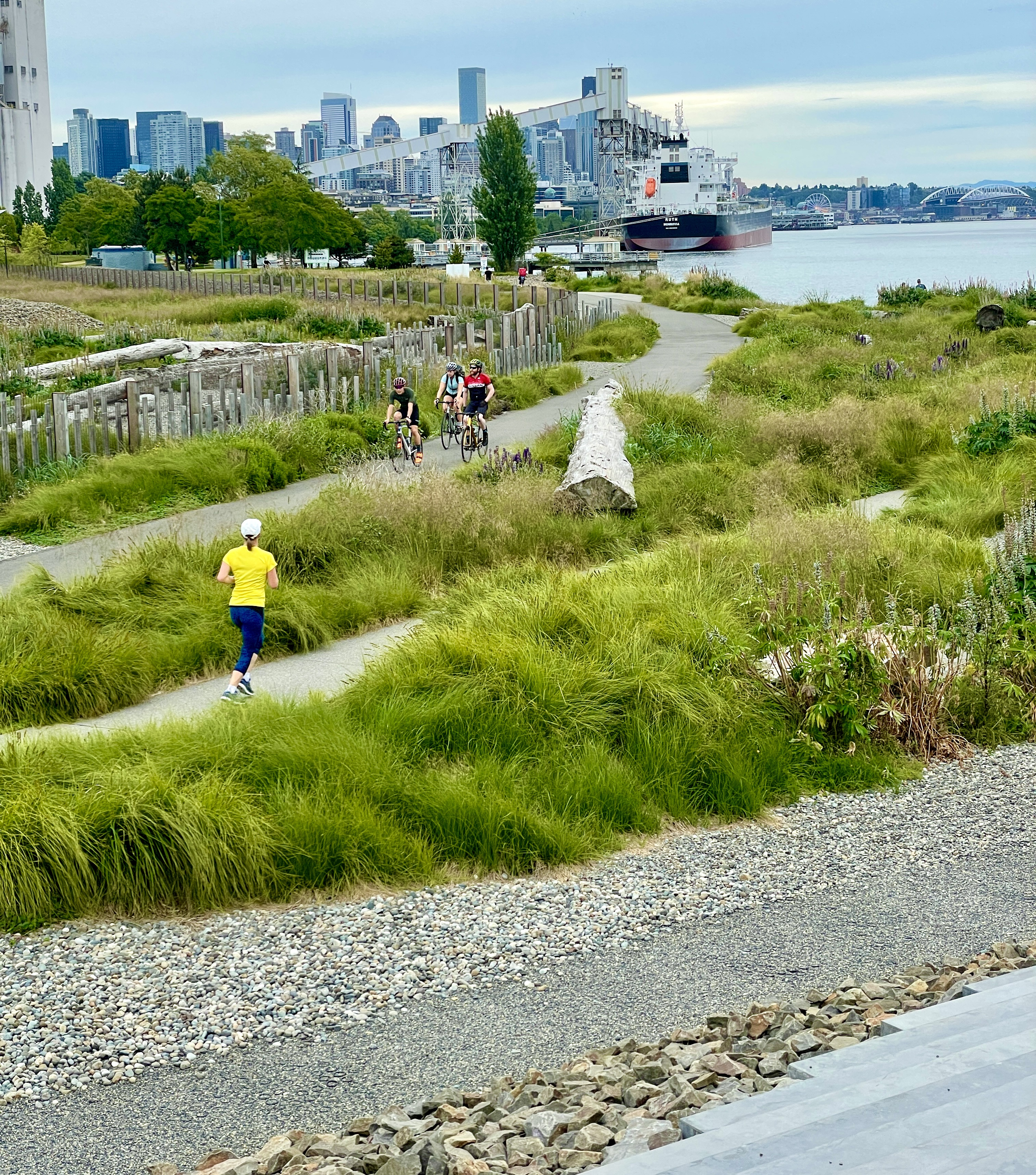
- The Elliott Bay Trail in Centennial Park
- Interactive map of Centennial Park
- Location: Seattle, Washington, U.S.
- Coordinates: 47°37′21″N 122°21′59″W
- Area: 11 acres (4.5 ha)

Centennial Park (formerly Elliott Bay Park) is an 11-acre (4.5 ha) public park in Seattle, in the U.S. state of Washington, owned and operated by the Port of Seattle. It was constructed using rubble from the construction of Interstate 5 alongside nearby Myrtle Edwards Park. Both parks underwent a major renovation from March 2025 to June 2026 with $56 million in private donations from Melinda French Gates, MacKenzie Scott, and other contributors. Centennial Park gained a coffee shop and public restrooms, along with new gardens with native plants.
