= Fishermen's Terminal =

Marina in Seattle, Washington, U.S.

Coordinates: 47°39′33″N 122°22′43″W

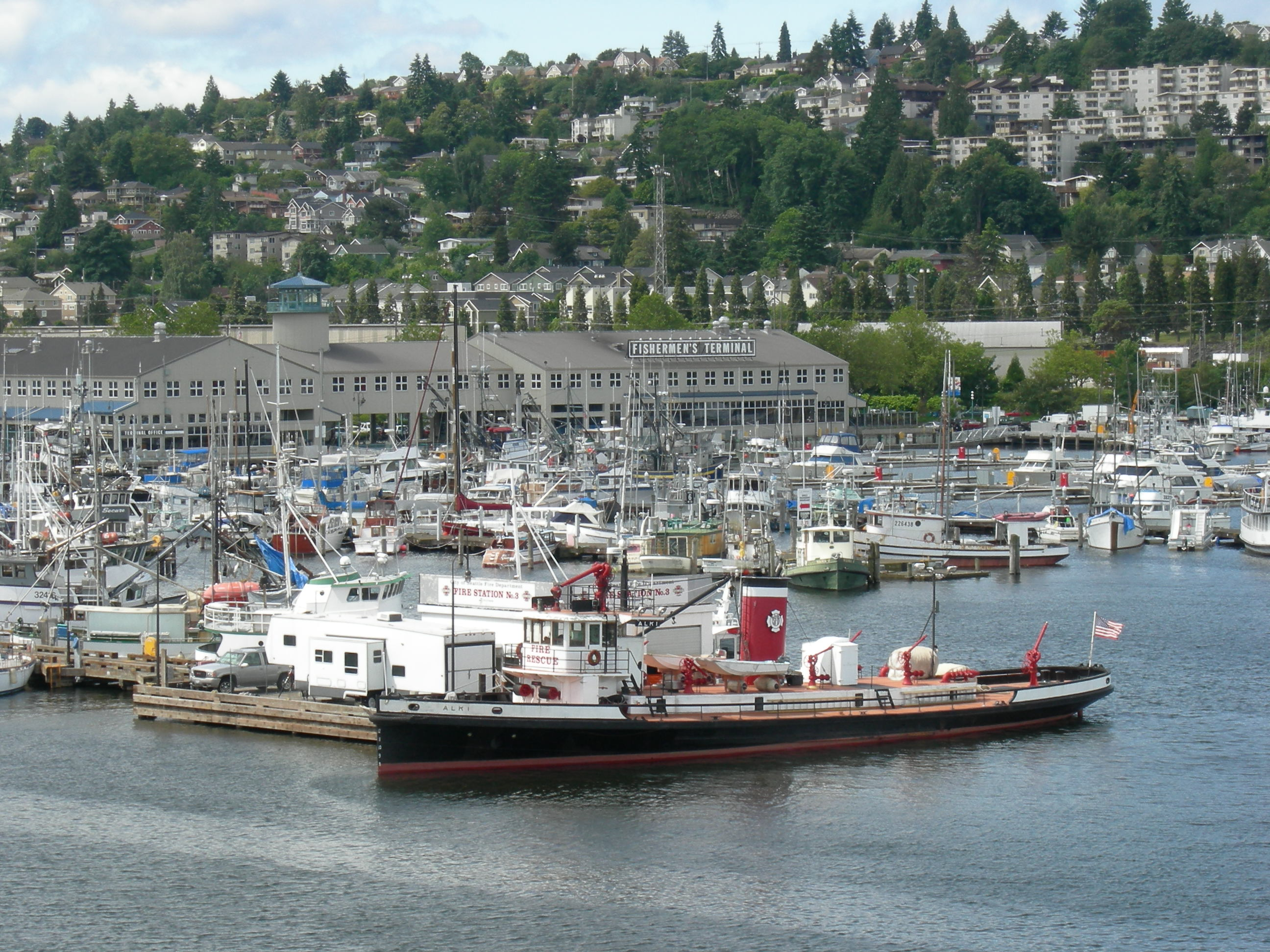
- Fishermen's Terminal seen looking roughly southwest from the Ballard Bridge. The eastern ridge of the Magnolia neighborhood can be seen behind the terminal.

Location
- Location: Seattle, Washington, United States

Details
- Operator: Port of Seattle
- Opened: 1914
- Joins: Salmon Bay, Lake Washington Ship Canal
- Entries: 1
- Transport links: BNSF Railway

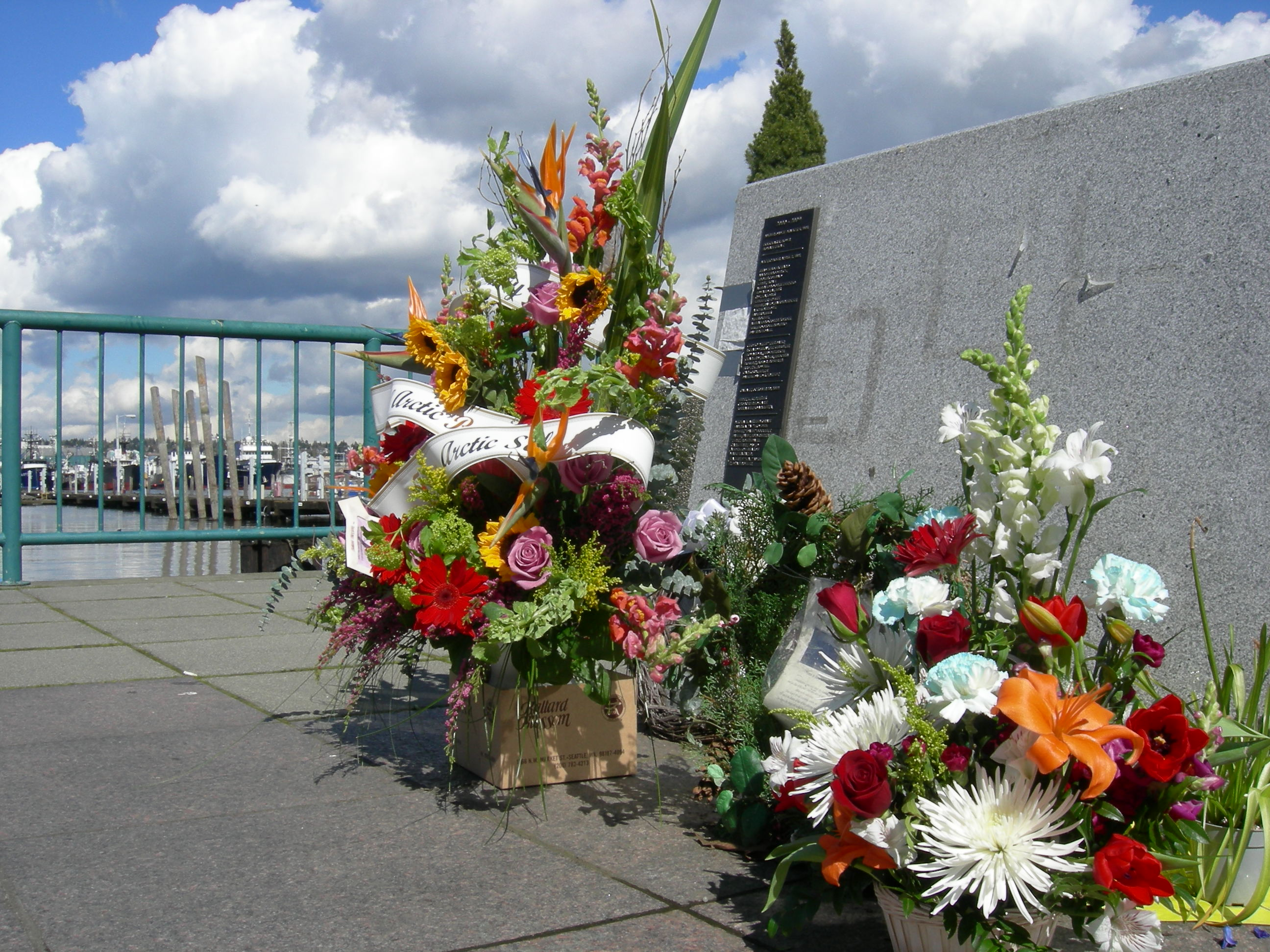
Flowers left at the Seattle Fishermen's Memorial for the dead of the Arctic Rose

Fishermen's Terminal is a dock opened in 1914 and operated by the Port of Seattle as the home port for Seattle's commercial fishing fleet, and, since 2002, non-commercial pleasure craft. The Terminal is on Salmon Bay in the Interbay neighborhood, east of the Hiram M. Chittenden Locks and immediately west of the Ballard Bridge.

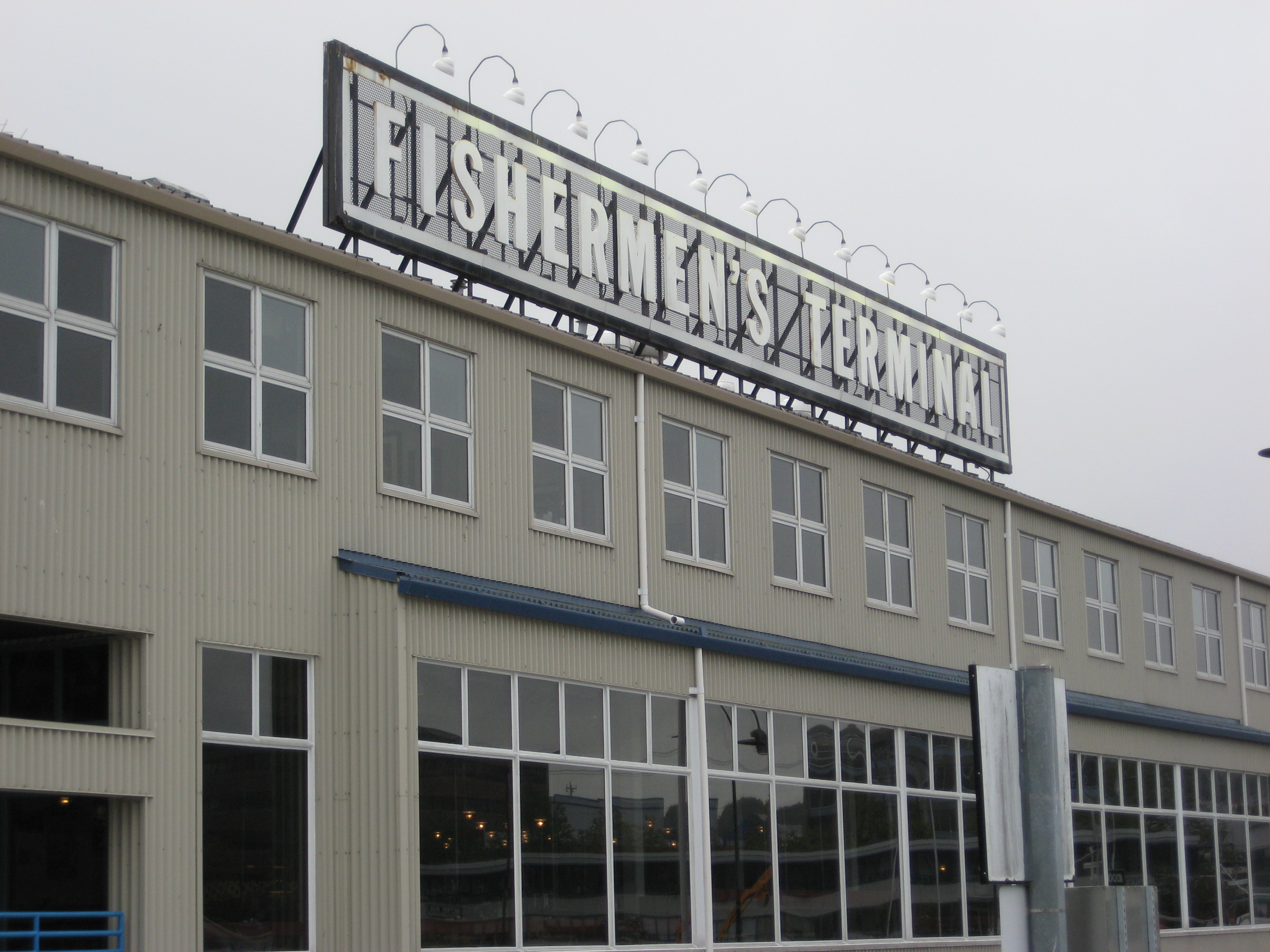
Fisherman's Terminal

The Terminal has freshwater mooring for fishing vessels and pleasure craft up to 250 ft (76 m) length. Preference is given to commercial fishing vessels. It serves more than 700 vessels. A public access float provides free moorage for up to four hours for visitors. The facility also includes 227,000 square feet (21,100 m^{2}) of office, retail, restaurant, light industry and warehouse space. There are three restaurants, a seafood market, a bookstore and a gift shop.

Fisherman's Terminal is home to some of the vessels in the Discovery Channel TV series Deadliest Catch. It was also the topic of a documentary film Fishermen's Terminal. The documentary centers on the conflict between the moorage needs of the fishing fleet and pleasure boaters.

The Seattle Fishermen's Memorial faces the water between the docks and the Terminal building. It is bronze and stone sculpture with plaques memorializing more than 670 local commercial fishermen and women who have been lost at sea since the beginning of the 20th century. The memorial is managed by its own non-profit organization. Since 1988, the Terminal has hosted the annual Fishermen's Fall Festival for the return of the North Pacific fishing fleet.
