= Seattle Fishermen's Memorial =

Sculpture in Seattle, Washington, U.S.

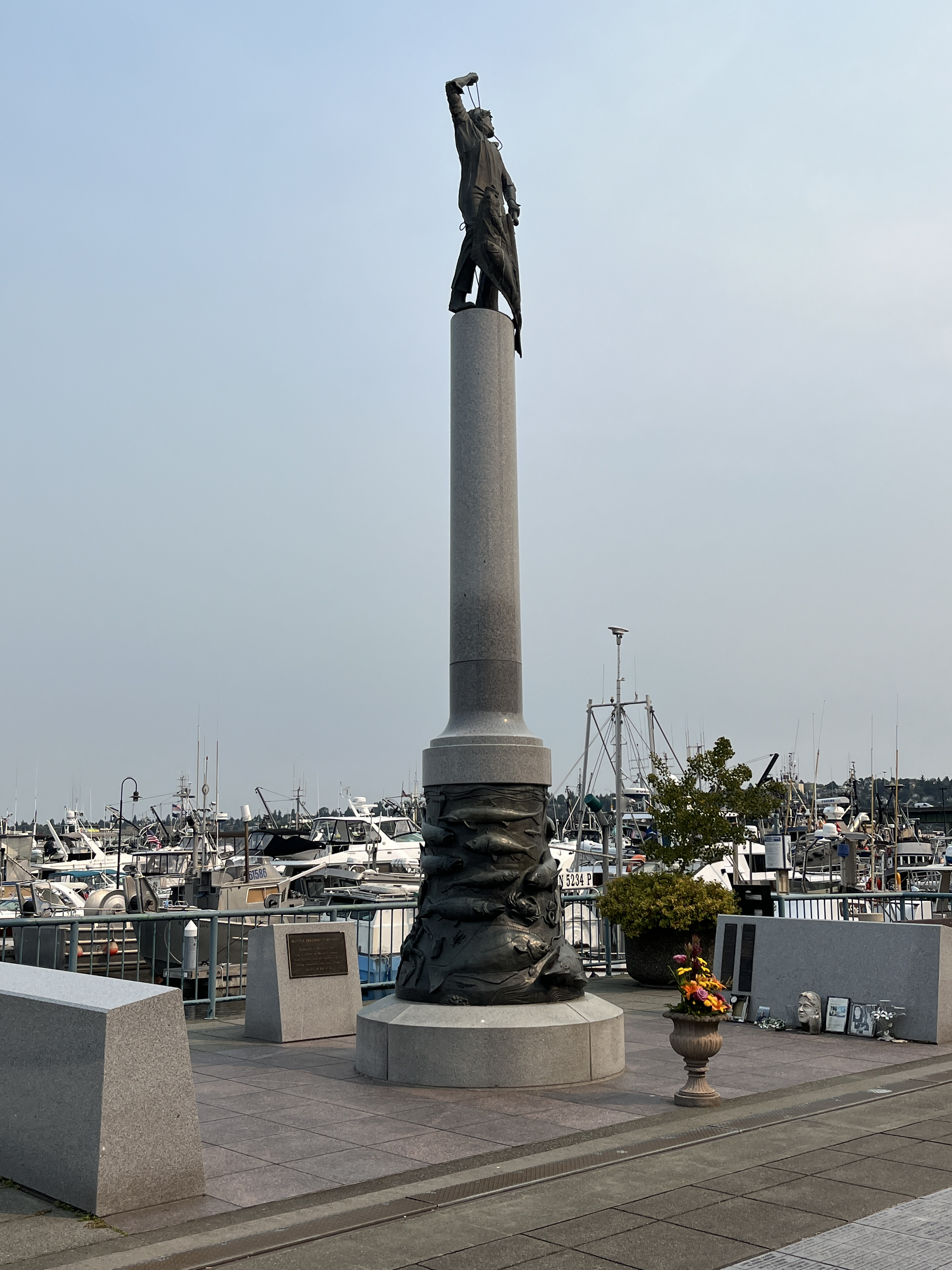
- The memorial in 2024
- Artist: Ronald Petty
- Type: Sculpture
- Medium: Bronze, concrete
- Dimensions: 9.1 m (30 ft)
- Condition: "Well maintained" (1994)
- Location: Seattle, Washington, United States; 47.65589°N 122.380643°W

Seattle Fishermen's Memorial, or Fisherman's Memorial, is an outdoor sculpture by Ronald Petty, installed at Fishermen's Terminal in Seattle, Washington, in the United States. The monument was designed in 1987 and dedicated in October 1988. It commemorates Seattle fisherman who died since 1900.

== Description ==
Ronald Petty's Seattle Fishermen's Memorial is installed at Docks 8 and 9 at Seattle's Fishermen's Terminal. The monument features a 30-foot (9.1 m) cast stone column supporting a bronze standing male figure, who holds a fishing line in his proper right hand. A fish is attached to the end of the line. The column's base is a bronze relief depicting 32 "sea creatures", including fish. Adjacent to the column is a concrete wall with bronze plaques displaying the names of around 460 Seattle fishermen who died since 1900.

== History ==
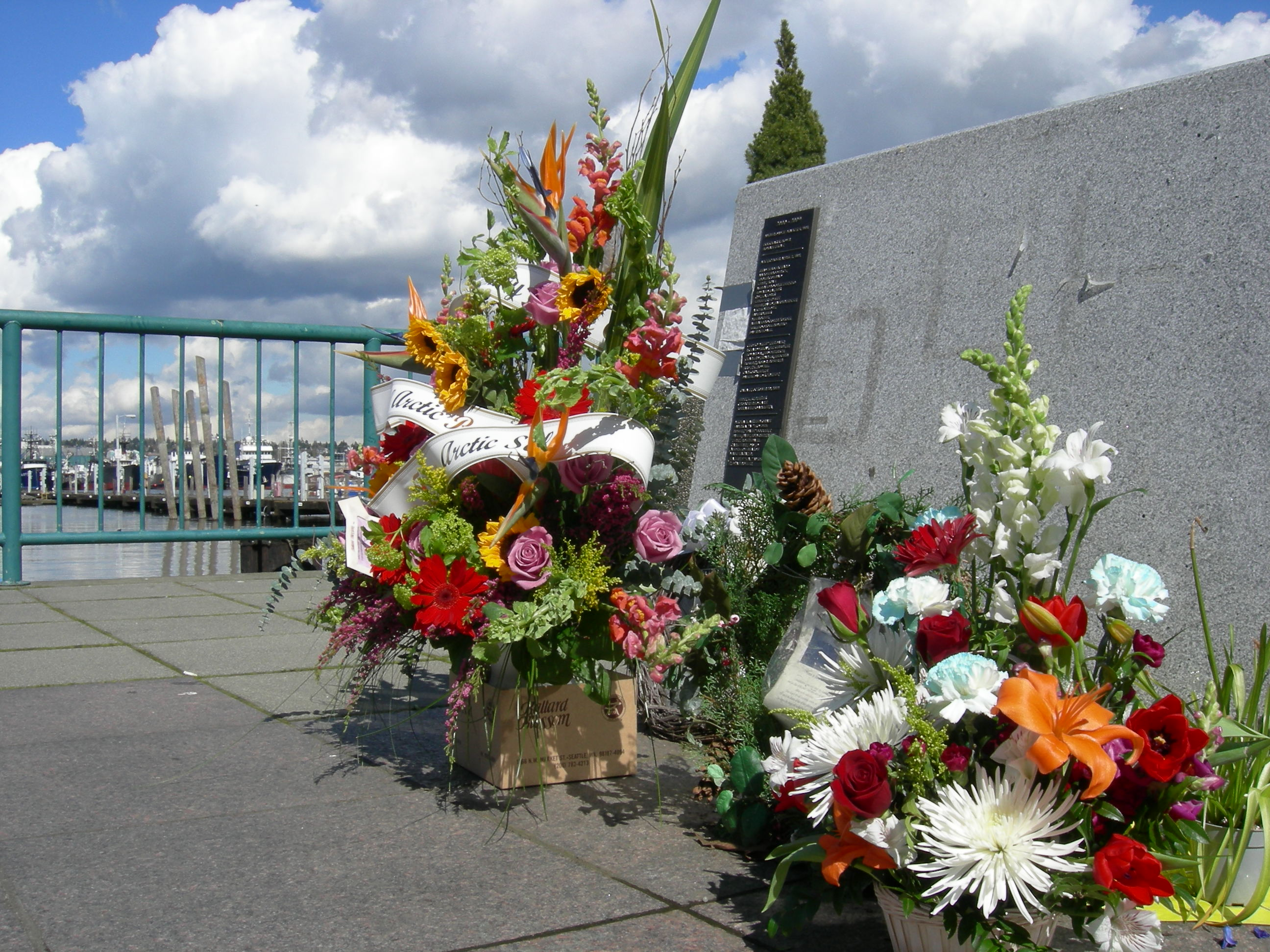
Wreath in memory of the dead of the Arctic Rose, 2007

The memorial was designed in 1987 to "honor commercial fishermen from the Seattle area who have been lost at sea". It was dedicated on October 8, 1988. The sculpture was surveyed and deemed "well maintained" by the Smithsonian Institution's "Save Outdoor Sculpture!" program in January 1994. It is administered by the Seattle Fishermen's Memorial Foundation.

== See also ==
- 1988 in art
