= West Point (disambiguation) =

West Point is the United States Military Academy, at West Point, New York.

West Point may also refer to:

== Places ==
=== United Kingdom ===
- West Point (building), a tower block in Leeds, West Yorkshire, England
- Westpoint Arena, a multi-purpose arena near Exeter, UK

=== United States ===
- West Point, Alabama
- West Point, Arkansas
- West Point, California
- West Point, Georgia
  - West Point Lake
- West Point, Illinois
- West Point, Indiana
- West Point, Iowa
- West Point, Kentucky
- West Point, Minnesota
- West Point, Mississippi
- West Point, Nebraska
- West Point, New York
  - West Point Cemetery on the United States Military Academy grounds, West Point, New York
  - West Point Mint, in New York
- West Point, Columbiana County, Ohio
- West Point, Morrow County, Ohio
- West Point, Pennsylvania
- Westpoint, Tennessee
- West Point, Fayette County, Texas
- West Point, Lynn County, Texas, on U.S. Route 380
- West Point, Utah
- West Point, Virginia
- West Point (Seattle), Washington
  - West Point Light, Seattle
  - West Point Treatment Plant, Seattle
- West Point, Wisconsin, a town

=== Elsewhere ===
- West Point, Hong Kong
- West Point, Monrovia, Liberia
- West Point, Prince Edward Island, Canada
- West Point Island, Falkland Islands
- Westpoint, a shopping centre in Blacktown, a suburb of Sydney, Australia
- Westpoint Performing Arts Centre, a performance venue in Auckland, New Zealand

== Arts, entertainment, and media ==
- West Point (film), a 1928 silent film starring Joan Crawford and William Haines
- The West Point Story (film), a 1950 musical comedy film
- The West Point Story (TV series), also known as simply West Point, a dramatic anthology television series
- Women at West Point, a 1979 TV movie
- Francis Goes to West Point, a 1952 comedy film

== Ships ==
- West Point (1847), a full-rigged sailing vessel built by Jacob Aaron Westervelt
- USS West Point (ID-3254), a cargo ship built in 1918
- USS West Point (AP-23), an ocean liner built in 1940

== Organisations ==
- Westpoint Corporation
- WestPoint Home, Inc.

== Other uses ==
- West Point (locomotive), the second steam locomotive built in the United States
- West Point Foundry, Cold Spring, New York
