= Brightwater Treatment Plant =

Sewage treatment plant in Snohomish County, Washington

Coordinates: 47.79°N 122.14°W

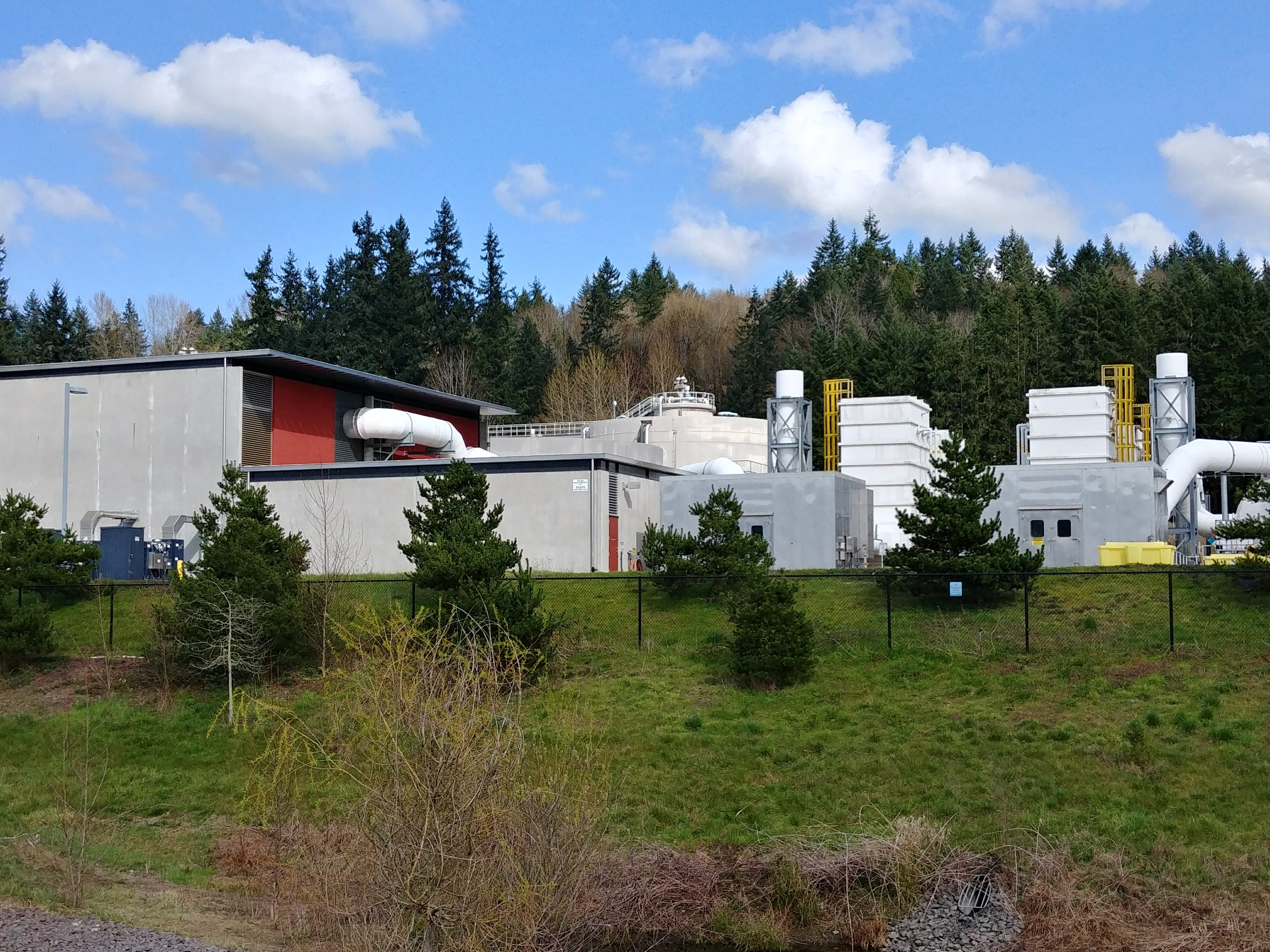
Part of the Brightwater works

Brightwater is a regional sewage treatment plant in south Snohomish County, Washington, United States. It serves parts of the Seattle metropolitan area and was opened in 2011. The plant construction and associated tunneling were a five-year megaproject costing $1.8 billion.

== Site description ==
Brightwater is a 114-acre (46 ha) facility at the intersection of State Route 9 and State Route 522 north of Woodinville. The plant itself occupies 114 acres (46 ha); the remainder of the property is used for stormwater treatment and environmental mitigation such as constructed wetlands and stormwater retention.

=== Tunnel ===
A 13-mile (21 km), 17.5-foot-diameter (5.3 m) tunnel was built by several tunnel boring machines from the treatment plant to a marine outfall nearly due west on Puget Sound. The outfall is 600 feet (180 m) below the surface. Construction delays were incurred due to unexpected soil conditions causing damage to the boring machines.

The problems with the Brightwater tunnel were considered when planning other large regional tunnel projects, including the Link light rail Capitol Hill tunnel and the Alaskan Way Viaduct replacement tunnel.

The tunnel was completed in 2011, and full use of the outfall began on November 2, 2012.

== History ==
In August 2002, then King County Executive Ron Sims announced that a billion-dollar regional sewage-treatment plant named "Brightwater" would be built in neighboring Snohomish County and provide service for parts of King and Snohomish counties. It would help ease demand on South and West Point Treatment Plants.

=== Controversies ===
Since its proposal, Brightwater has been the subject of numerous lawsuits, including a lawsuit by King County against Snohomish County that was settled when King County agreed to pay $70 million for public safety, habitat protection, and parks in Snohomish County. The project has also had many cost overruns, totaling over $272 million. In December 2006, the project had resolved all its lawsuits and only needed building permits from Snohomish County. However, concerns remain over the siting of the project, both from its future neighbors worried about the smells associated with sewage treatment and geologists due to at least one active fault line running through the site, and concerns over whether a new plant was necessary when eliminating stormwater and wastewater from the sewage system. King County countered these concerns by stating the plant will feature advanced odor control, 40 acres (16 ha) of wildlife habitat will be restored, the plant has been designed to withstand a 7.3-magnitude earthquake, and that the project will be paid by new customers.

== Public art ==
The Brightwater plant includes 15 works of public art. The $4.4 million acquisition was funded through the county One Percent for Art construction setaside program.
