= South Treatment Plant =

Wastewater treatment plant in Renton, Washington

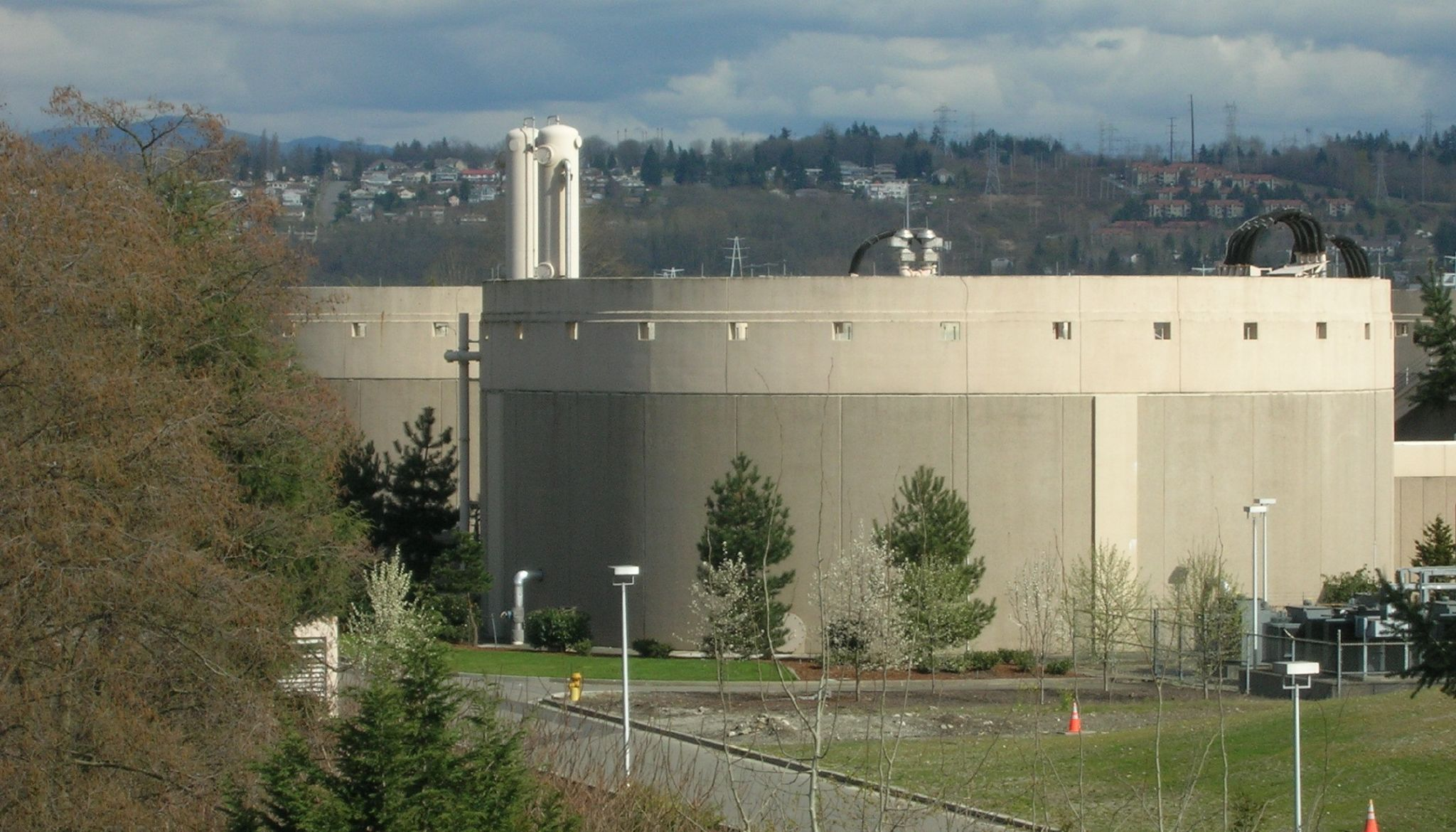

The South Treatment Plant is a wastewater treatment plant in Renton, Washington owned by King County. The plant opened in 1965, and treats over 90 million U.S. gallons (340 million liters) of wastewater per day. It treats sewage for 650,000 people in the cities of Renton, Auburn, Bellevue, Issaquah, Kent, and Sammamish.

== History ==
Before the plant was built, raw sewage flowed directly into the Puget Sound. The visibly polluted water often led to beach closures. Communities surrounding Seattle dumped wastewater into Lake Washington, contaminating it as well. In 1958, voters created the Municipality of Metropolitan Seattle (Metro) to address this problem. Two treatment plants were planned, South Treatment Plant and the West Point Treatment Plant in Seattle. The plant broke ground in 1961, on land from a former golf course, and opened in 1966.

The plant received $6 million worth of upgrades in 2013, alongside numerous other improvements to the local wastewater system.

== Operation ==
South Treatment Plant is one of three major wastewater treatment plants in the area, alongside the West Point and Brightwater plants. It can provide primary treatment for up to 325 million U.S. gallons (1,230 million liters), and secondary treatment for up to 240 million U.S. gallons (910 million liters). The treatment process begins with filtration and primary treatment by sedimentation. Secondary treatment is accomplished by aeration tanks and clarifier tanks. The effluent is disinfected with hypochlorite. Recycled water from the plant undergoes tertiary treatment with a sand filter, while the rest of the effluent is pumped into Puget Sound through a 12-mile (19 km) pipe. At Duwamish Head the transfer line's effluent enters two underwater pipes that take it 1.9 miles (3.1 km) offshore where it is diffused through 168 ports into the water of Elliott Bay at a depth of 607 feet (185 m). From the bottom of the bay, the lighter freshwater effluent further diffuses as it rises through the heavier saltwater.

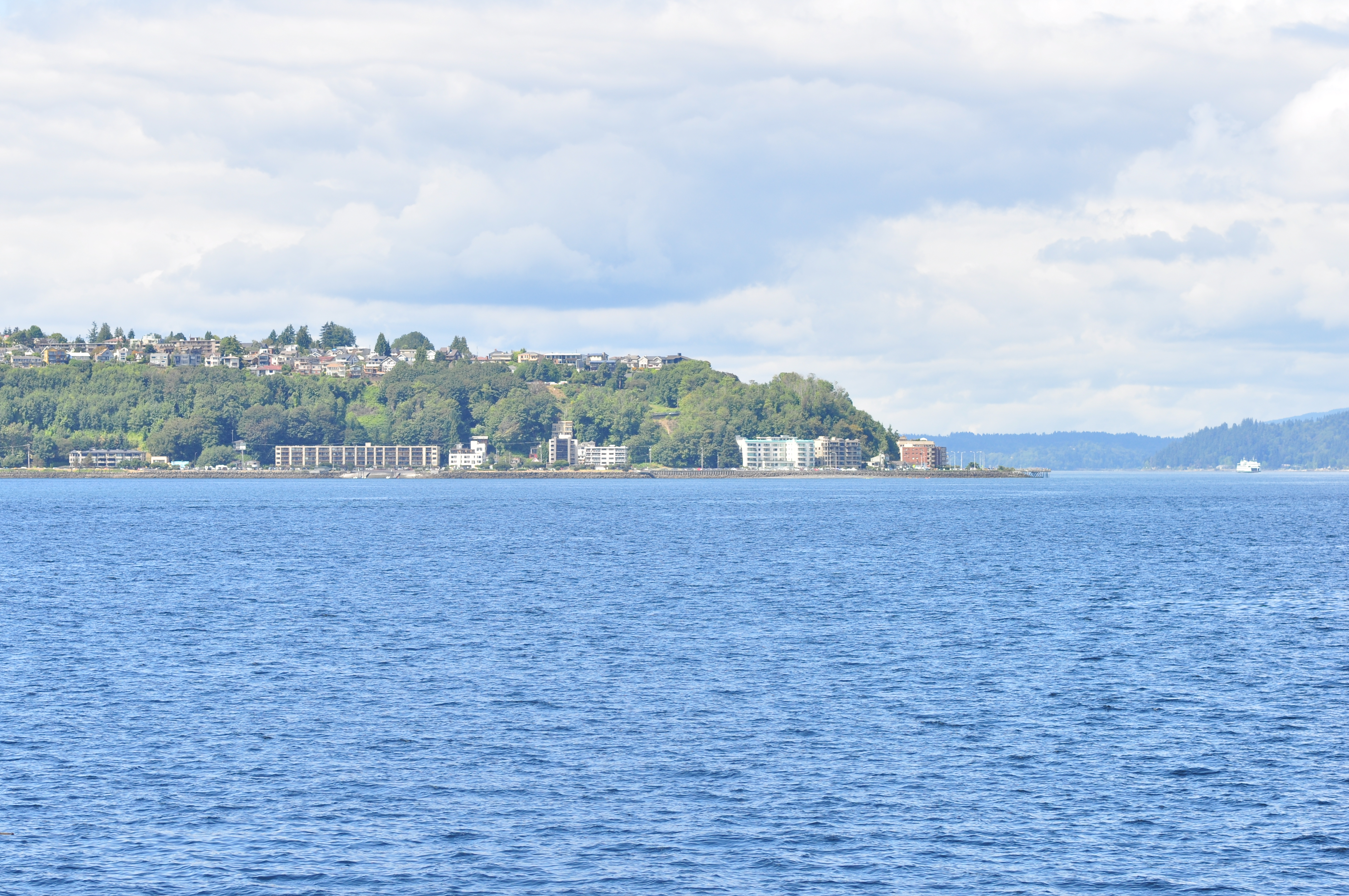
At Duwamish Head, underwater pipes diffuse treated effluent into Elliott Bay

Solids are treated with a blend tank, dissolved air flotation tank, and anaerobic digestion. After dewatering in a centrifuge, the remaining solids are sold as Loop biosolids, which are used as fertilizer.

After scrubbing, biogas recovered from the anaerobic treatment process is used within the facility for heating and energy, and is also sold to Puget Sound Energy as natural gas. The plant uses the incoming effluent as a heat sink for large heat pumps; these provide the heat needed for the digestion portion of the treatment process. King County can therefore sell the plant's biogas since it is not needed for heating. The South Treatment Plant is one of only a few plants that scrubs its biogas to commercial pipeline quality and it has served as a model for initiatives to upgrade other plants with this capability. In 2018, King County sold $6 million worth of natural gas generated at this facility.

In 2004, King County installed a 1 MW molten carbonate fuel cell at the South Treatment plant as a demonstration project in cooperation with the United States Environmental Protection Agency. At the time, it was the largest fuel cell of this kind in the world and operated on either internally produced or purchased gas.

The plant has septage disposal facilities, serving businesses and commercial facilities. In addition to wastewater treatment, the facility has an educational role, with public tours and a demonstration garden.

The plant lies at a low elevation in the Green River valley, and is vulnerable to flooding. Efforts such as flood walls have been used to protect the plant. The plant also has to handle large inflows from the King County system during heavy rainstorms; it uses a special treatment process for this.

In 2018, the plant won an award from the Washington State Department of Ecology for its excellent operational record. However, in 2019, it suffered from a release of partially treated wastewater, leading to beach closures.
