= West Point (locomotive) =

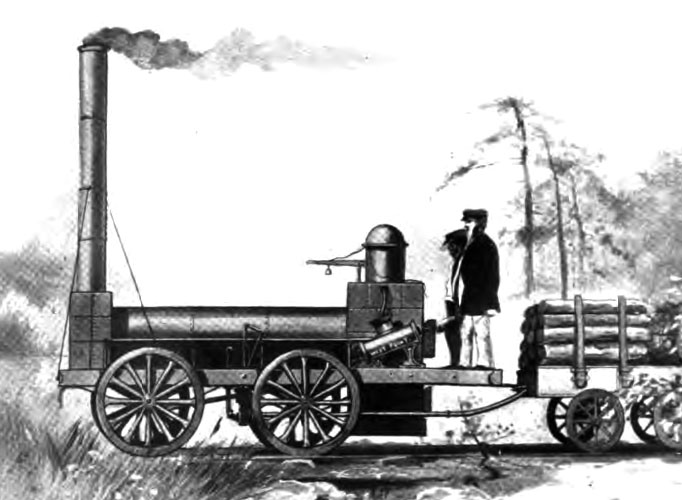
Type and origin
- Power type: Steam
- Designer: Horatio Allen
- Builder: West Point Foundry
- Build date: 1830
Specifications
- Configuration
  - Whyte: 0-4-0
  - UIC: B
- Driver dia.: 4 feet 6 inches (1,372 mm)
- Cylinders: Two
- Cylinder size: 6 in × 16 in (152 mm × 406 mm)

West Point was the third steam locomotive constructed in the United States. It was constructed for the South Carolina Railroad by the West Point Foundry of New York and built to plans from Horatio Allen.

The locomotive was built in 1830 and shipped to Charleston, South Carolina, on the Lafayette, arriving there on February 28, 1831, and entering service shortly thereafter.

Its frame and running gear were identical to the earlier Best Friend of Charleston from the same builder, but instead of the Best Friend's vertical boiler, the West Point was fitted with a horizontal locomotive boiler.
