= West Point Treatment Plant =

Wastewater treatment plant in Seattle

Coordinates: 47°39′45″N 122°25′45″W

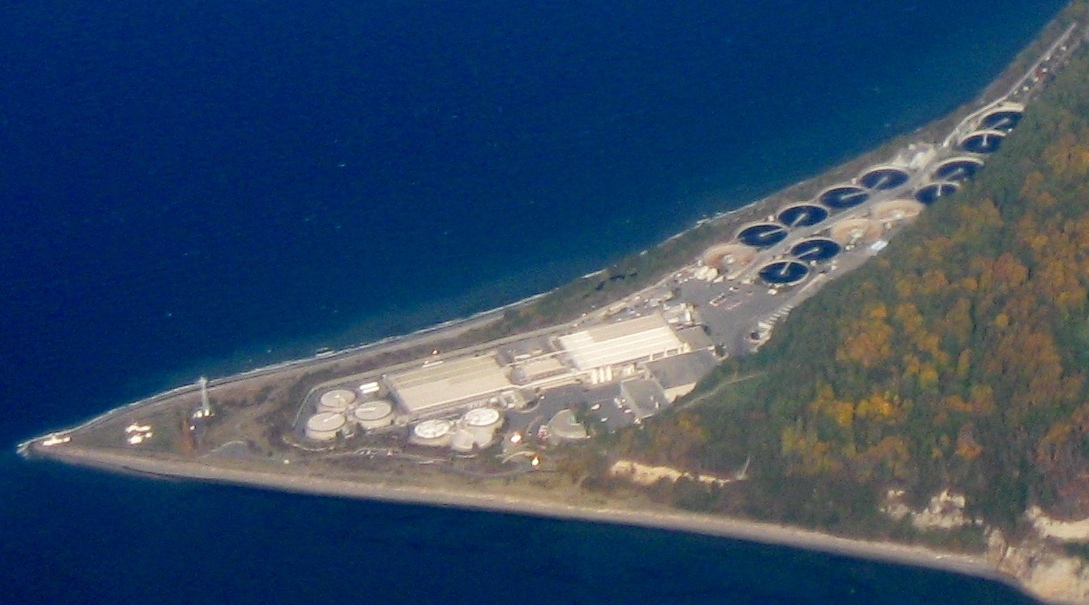
Aerial view of the plant and surroundings

The West Point Treatment Plant is a major wastewater treatment plant in Seattle, WA. It is located in Seattle's Magnolia neighborhood, within Discovery Park. It is located at the tip of West Point, near the West Point Lighthouse. Operated by King County Wastewater Treatment Division (WTD), the plant handles significant wastewater and stormwater flows from the City of Seattle and other nearby communities. In 2017, the plant suffered a catastrophic flood that disabled it for months.

== History ==
West Point Treatment Plant originally opened in 1966, providing only primary treatment. Before the plant was built, raw sewage flowed directly into the Puget Sound. The visibly polluted water often led to beach closures. Communities surrounding Seattle at that time also dumped wastewater directly into Lake Washington, severely contaminating it as well. In 1958, voters created the Municipality of Metropolitan Seattle (Metro) to address this problem. Two treatment plants were planned, the West Point Treatment Plant in Seattle and the South Treatment Plant in Renton. At the time, the $140 million campaign was considered the most costly pollution control effort in the country, but proved to be a major success in the restoration of Lake Washington, all prior to the establishment of the Environmental Protection Agency in 1970.

In 1994, Metro was merged into the King County municipal government. Secondary treatment was added to the plant in 1996 to meet federal Clean Water Act requirements.

== Operation ==
West Point is one of three major wastewater treatment plants in the area, alongside the South and Brightwater plants. The plant serves Seattle, Shoreline, and other surrounding areas of King County and Snohomish County. Some sewers draining to West Point are combined sewer systems, which carry both wastewater and stormwater. Upgrades are underway to strengthen this system against greater storms due to climate change. The system currently treats approximately 90 million U.S. gallons (340 million liters) per day during dry conditions and over 300 million U.S. gallons (1,100 million liters) per day during wet conditions. Primary treatment is possible for flows up to 440 million U.S. gallons (1,700 million liters) per day.

The plant begins with basic filtration and primary treatment. Secondary treatment consists of aeration tanks and clarifier tanks. Water is disinfected with hypochlorite before it is released into the Puget Sound.

Solids are thickened and anaerobically digested. Gas from the process is burned for electricity to power the plant, and is sold as natural gas. The remaining solids are sold as nutrient-rich Loop biosolids, which are used for agriculture and habitat restoration.

== 2017 flood ==
On February 9, 2017, the plant suffered from a massive flood. At about 2:12 AM, a momentary power fluctuation from Seattle City Light caused effluent pumps to trip and turn off; this event, along with failures of other safeguards, led to a major flooding event within the plant and a massive discharge of wastewater directly into the Puget Sound. Over 180 million U.S. gallons (680 million liters) were released, including 30 million U.S. gallons (110 million liters) of sewage. While water quality was not severely affected, the flood devastated the plant. Many of the underground parts of the plant were flooded, compromising employee safety during the flood and requiring decontamination and costly repairs. Furthermore, the flood destroyed the microbial communities in the anaerobic digesters. This compromised treatment capabilities even after the flood.

In 2021, King County management issued an emergency declaration to address the power fluctuation issue at West Point Treatment Plant. A major construction endeavor followed to enhance the reliability of the plant, with a Power Quality Improvement project being implemented in about 3.5 years. Constructed by Hoffman Construction Company, the battery-based Power Quality system was noted as the first project of its kind in the United States to enhance power stability to critical pump systems at this scale within a wastewater treatment plant, enabling West Point to “ride out” temporary power disruptions and reduce emergency bypasses of untreated wastewater to Puget Sound during severe storms.
