= West Point (Seattle) =

Headland in Seattle, Washington, United States

Coordinates: 47°39′42″N 122°26′13″W

West Point paq̓ac̓aɬčuʔ (Lushootseed)
- Point
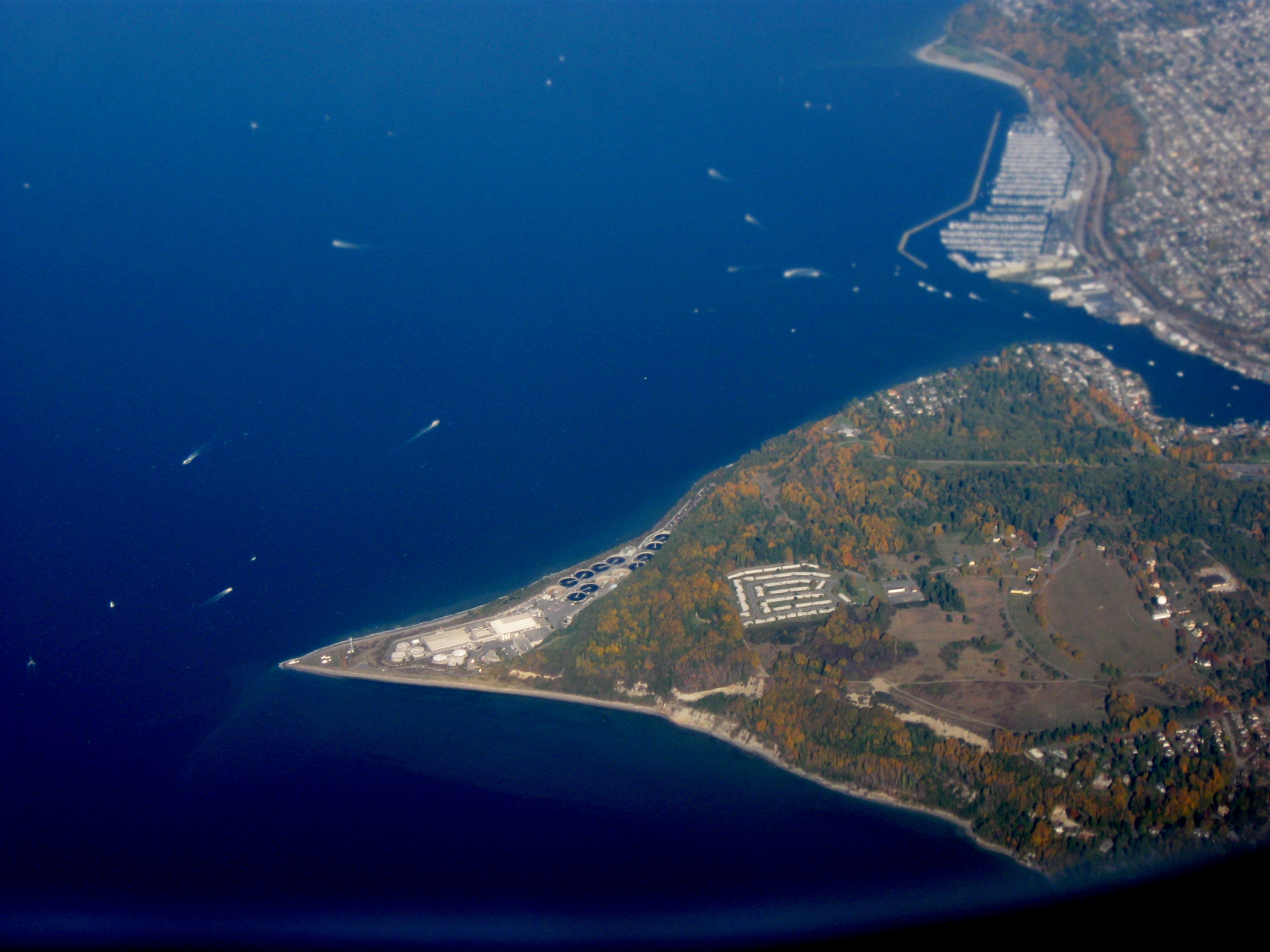
- Aerial photo of West Point
- Interactive map of West Point
- Location: Seattle, Washington, United States

West Point (Lushootseed: paq̓ac̓aɬčuʔ) is the westernmost point in Seattle, Washington, United States, jutting into Puget Sound from the Magnolia neighborhood. It also marks the northern extent of Elliott Bay; a line drawn southeastward to Alki Point marks the western extent of the bay. At the point itself is the 1881 West Point Lighthouse, the first staffed light station on Puget Sound. Just to the east is the West Point Treatment Plant, and beyond that, Discovery Park, formerly the U.S. Army's Fort Lawton.

The original Lushootseed name for West Point, paq̓ac̓aɬčuʔ, means "brush spread over water." West Point was given its English name in 1841 by U.S. Navy lieutenant Charles Wilkes, commander of the United States Exploring Expedition.

In 1992, construction of an expansion to the sewage treatment plant unearthed the archaeological remains of early Coast Salish peoples, including thousands of artifacts from 4,200 years ago.
