= Best Friend of Charleston =

Steam-powered railroad locomotive

Coordinates: 33.9986°N 81.0481°W

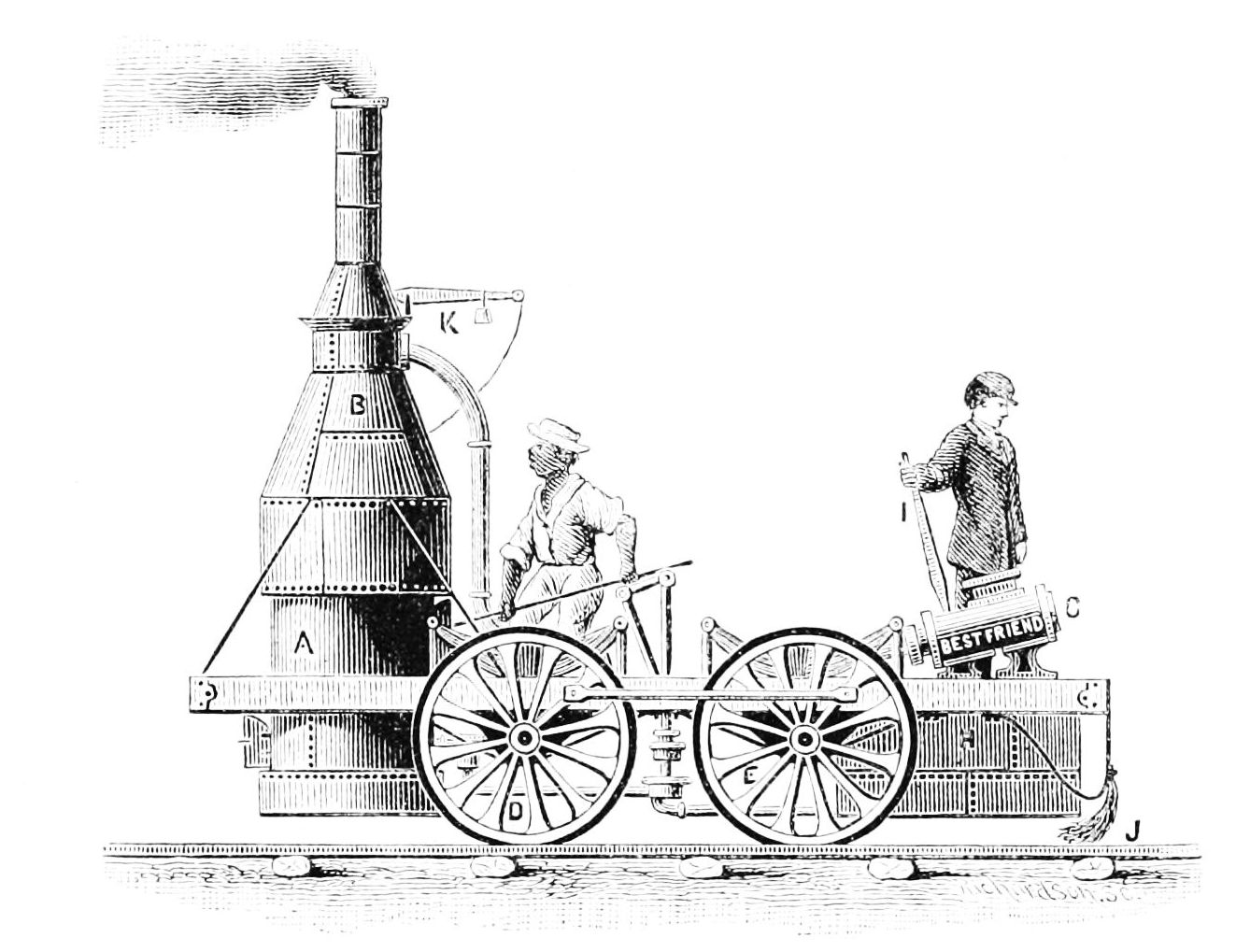
- line drawing of the Best Friend of Charleston
Type and origin
- Power type: Steam
- Builder: West Point Foundry
Specifications
- Configuration
  - Whyte: 0-4-0VB+T
- Gauge: 5 ft (1,524 mm)
Career
- Locale: Charleston, South Carolina
- Delivered: October 1830
- First run: December 25, 1830
- Disposition: Boiler exploded June 17, 1831; some parts reused to build Phoenix

The Best Friend of Charleston was a steam-powered railroad locomotive widely considered the first locomotive to be built entirely within the United States for revenue service. It was also the first locomotive to suffer a boiler explosion in the United States.

== History ==
The locomotive was built for the South Carolina Canal and Rail Road Company by the West Point Foundry of New York in 1830. Disassembled for shipment by boat to Charleston, South Carolina, it arrived in October of that year and was unofficially named The Best Friend of Charleston. After its inaugural run on Christmas Day, it was used in regular passenger service along a six-mile (9.7 km) demonstration route in Charleston. At the time, it was considered one of the fastest modes of transport, taking its passengers "on the wings of wind at the speed of fifteen to twenty-five miles per hour (24 to 40 km/h)." The only faster mode of travel was by an experienced horse and rider.

On June 17, 1831, the Best Friend was the first locomotive in the US to suffer a boiler explosion. The blast is said to have been caused by the fireman tying down the steam safety valve; he had grown tired of hearing it whistle, so to stop the noise he closed the valve permanently. (Another account has him placing a stout piece of lumber on the safety valve and sitting on it.) He may also have tried to overpressure the boiler as the locomotive was expected to perform hard work (e.g. climbing a gradient upon setting off); this was common practice and a common cause of boiler bursts until a tamper-proof safety valve was produced. The blocked valve caused the pressure within the boiler to exceed its capacity, and it exploded. The resulting blast was said to have hurled metal fragments over a wide area and killed the fireman. The locomotive's engineer, Nicholas Darrell, was uninjured in the explosion.

According to Centennial History of South Carolina Railroad, this wrote a new rule in the SCC&RR operating manual that engineers were to remain on station at all times, with the aid of newly hired conductors to manage cars, passengers and switches. Salvageable parts from the Best Friend were used to build the Phoenix, which seems to have run up to the time of the American Civil War. To restore passenger confidence, a flatcar piled high with protective cotton bales was placed between the locomotive and its passenger cars.

== Replicas ==
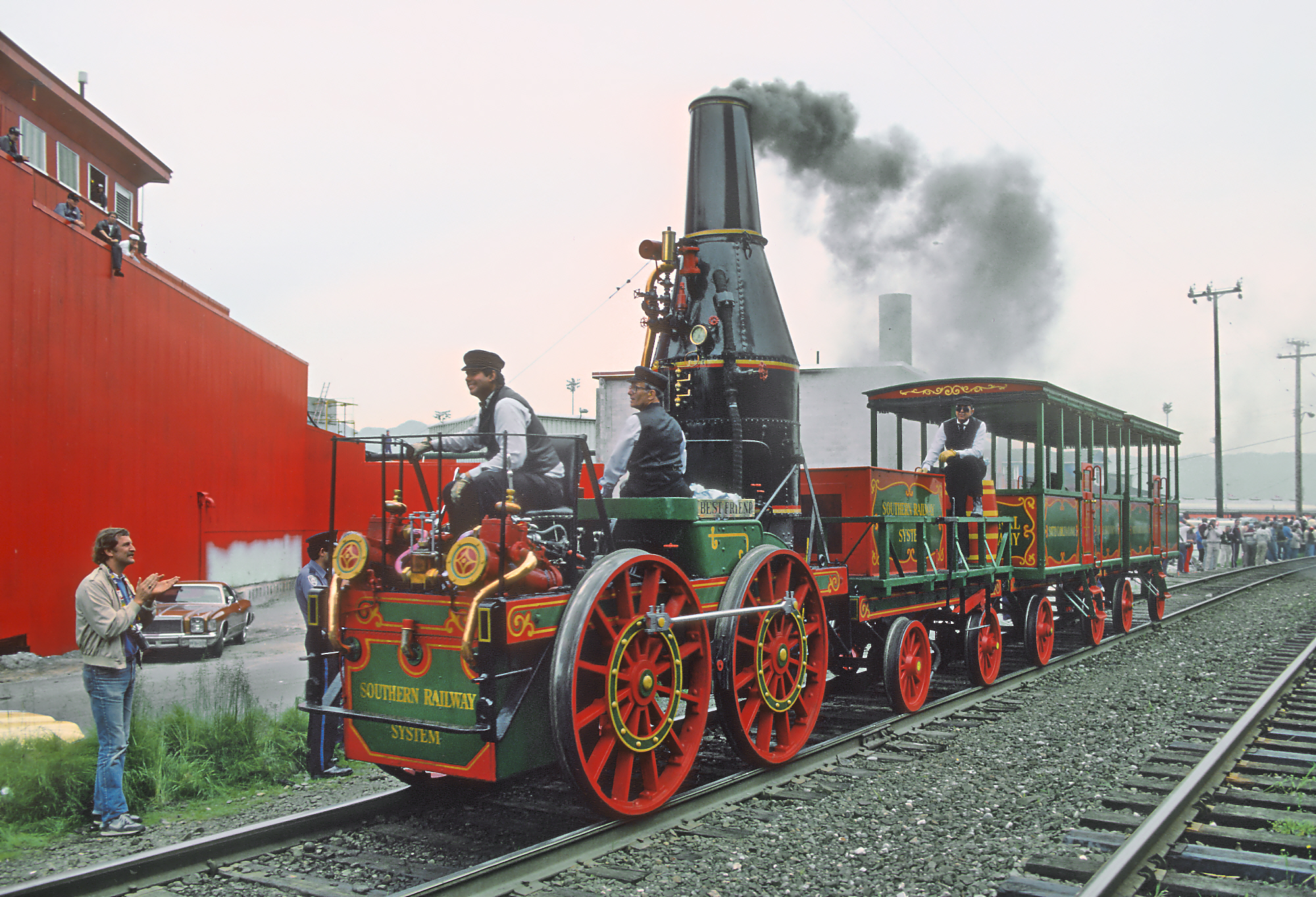
The 1928 replica in steam

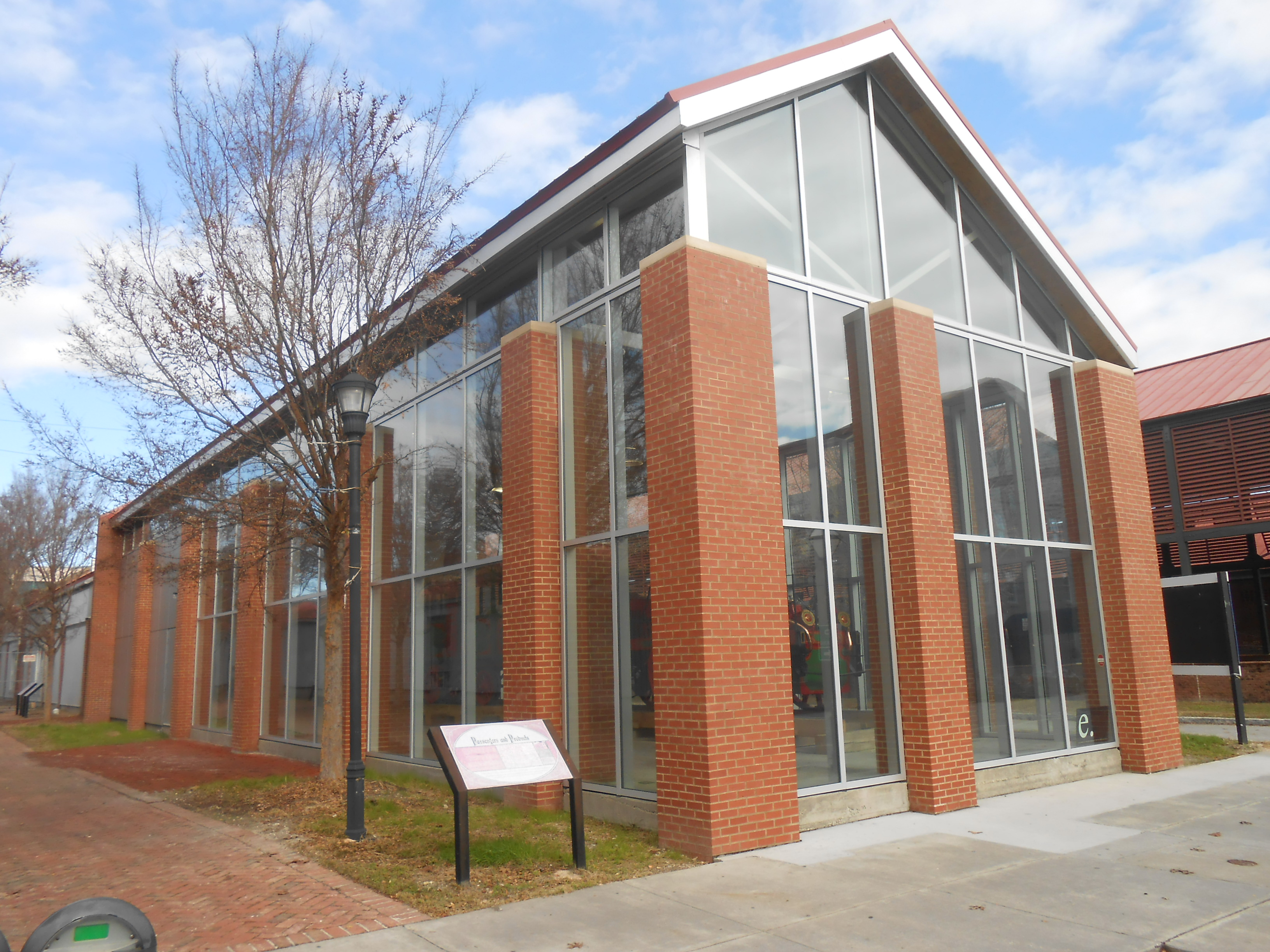
In 2013, a new display area for the 1928 replica of the Best Friend of Charleston was built at 32 Ann St. in downtown Charleston.

Today, an operable replica of the locomotive is in the hands of the Charleston, SC Chapter, National Railway Historical Society. It was built in 1928 to commemorate the centenary of the South Carolina Canal and Rail Road, and widely exhibited. On August 6, 2005, the City of Charleston lent it to the Norfolk Southern Railway (NS), the original SCRR line's current operator, for five years. After refurbishment at their shops in Chattanooga, NS brought the replica to New York City for display on December 12, 2005, outside the New York Stock Exchange Building in a ceremony commemorating 175 years of American railroad history. It was then put on public display at NS Atlanta headquarters at 1200 Peachtree Street in midtown Atlanta, GA; then transported by truck in October 2013 to Charleston, SC.

Another full-size replica is on exhibit at the South Carolina State Museum, in Columbia, South Carolina.

== Best Friend of Charleston Museum ==
In May 2014, the Best Friend of Charleston Museum opened on 23 Ann Street in the Charleston Historic District behind the Charleston Visitor Center and near the Charleston Museum.

== Timeline ==
- October 1830: the Best Friend arrives in Charleston from West Point Foundry.
- December 25, 1830: The Best Friend runs for the first time in Charleston.
- June 17, 1831: The boiler explodes on the Best Friend.
- Remains of Best Friend rebuilt in Charleston as Phoenix, which runs until the American Civil War.

== See also ==
- Tom Thumb locomotive
