= West Point Light =

Lighthouse in Seattle, Washington, U.S.

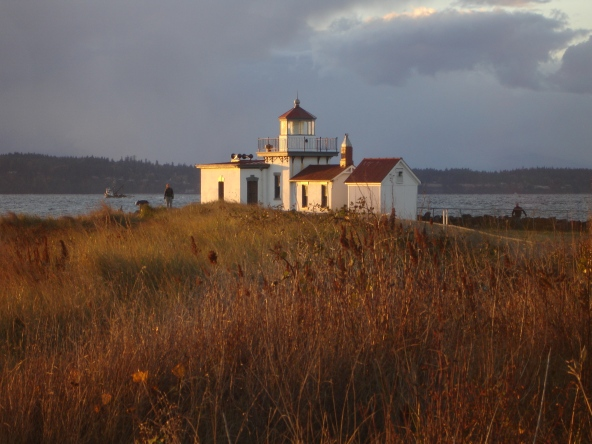
- Location: Seattle, Washington
- Coordinates: 47°39′42″N 122°26′08″W

Tower
- Constructed: 1881
- Foundation: Natural/emplaced
- Construction: Brick with stucco
- Automated: 1985
- Height: 7 m (23 ft)
- Shape: Square
- Markings: White
- Heritage: National Register of Historic Places listed place
- Fog signal: Horn: 1 every 10s, activated for 30 minutes by keying a mike 5 times on VHF channel 78A

Light
- First lit: 1881
- Focal height: 27 feet (8.2 m)
- Lens: Fourth order Fresnel lens (original), VRB-25 (current)
- Range: White 16 nautical miles (30 km; 18 mi), Red 13 nautical miles (24 km; 15 mi)
- Characteristic: Al WR 10s
- West Point Light Station
- U.S. National Register of Historic Places
- Nearest city: Seattle, Washington
- Area: 2 acres (0.81 ha)
- NRHP reference No.: 77001336
- Added to NRHP: August 16, 1977

The West Point Light, also known as the Discovery Park Lighthouse, is an active aid to navigation on Seattle, Washington's West Point, which juts into Puget Sound and marks the northern extent of Elliott Bay. The lighthouse is similar in design to the Point No Point Light and was added to the National Register of Historic Places in 1977. It is a main feature of Seattle's Discovery Park.

== History ==
The 23-foot-high (7.0 m) lighthouse began operation on November 15, 1881, using a fourth-order Fresnel lens. It was the first staffed light station on Puget Sound, built at a cost of $25,000 ($830,000 in today dollars). It was illuminated with a kerosene lamp for its first 44 years, until it was attached to Seattle's electric grid in 1926. It became automated in 1985, the last station in Washington to do so.

Under the National Historic Lighthouse Preservation Act of 2000, in early 2003, Seattle's Department of Parks and Recreation applied to the United States Department of the Interior to take custody of the lighthouse from the U.S. Coast Guard and incorporate it into Discovery Park. The city was granted the property in October 2004.

Included in the transfer of the property was the station's original 4th order Fresnel Lens. Upon signing over of the deed, the Coast Guard extinguished the original lighting system and replaced it with a modern Vega Rotating Beacon (VRB-25). The light retains its original characteristic of alternating red and white flashes every five seconds.

A $600,000 restoration project, undertaken in 2009, saw exterior work completed in 2010, and restoration of the keeper's quarters finished in 2011.

== Location, access, and controversy ==
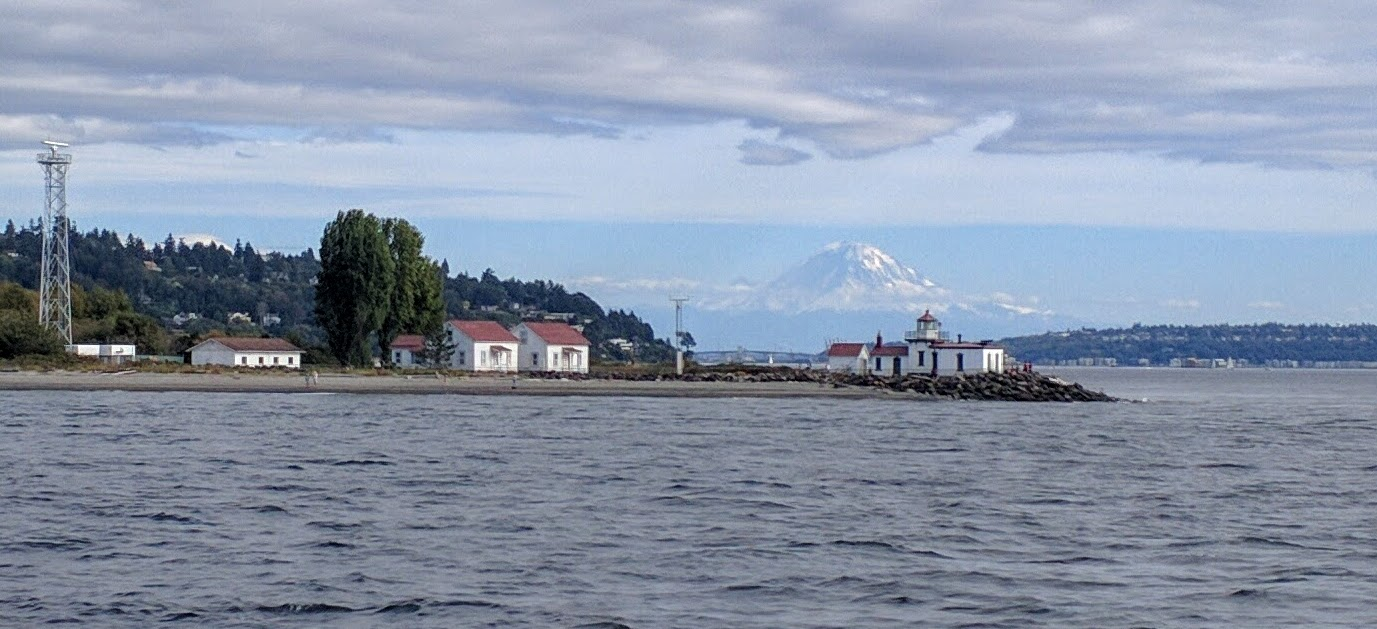
West Point Lighthouse with Mount Rainier behind, from the Argosy Locks Cruise boat, August 2016.

West Point Light is adjacent to the West Point Treatment Plant and public access. The lighthouse and beach area are under the Master Plan for Discovery Park; it was recommended that:

There will be great pressures to open up the park to automobiles, motorcycles and motor bikes. One of the greatest values of the park is, however, that it will afford the people a refuge from the noise, air pollution and danger of the automobile. We believe, therefore, that park patrons should not be permitted to drive their private vehicles through the park.

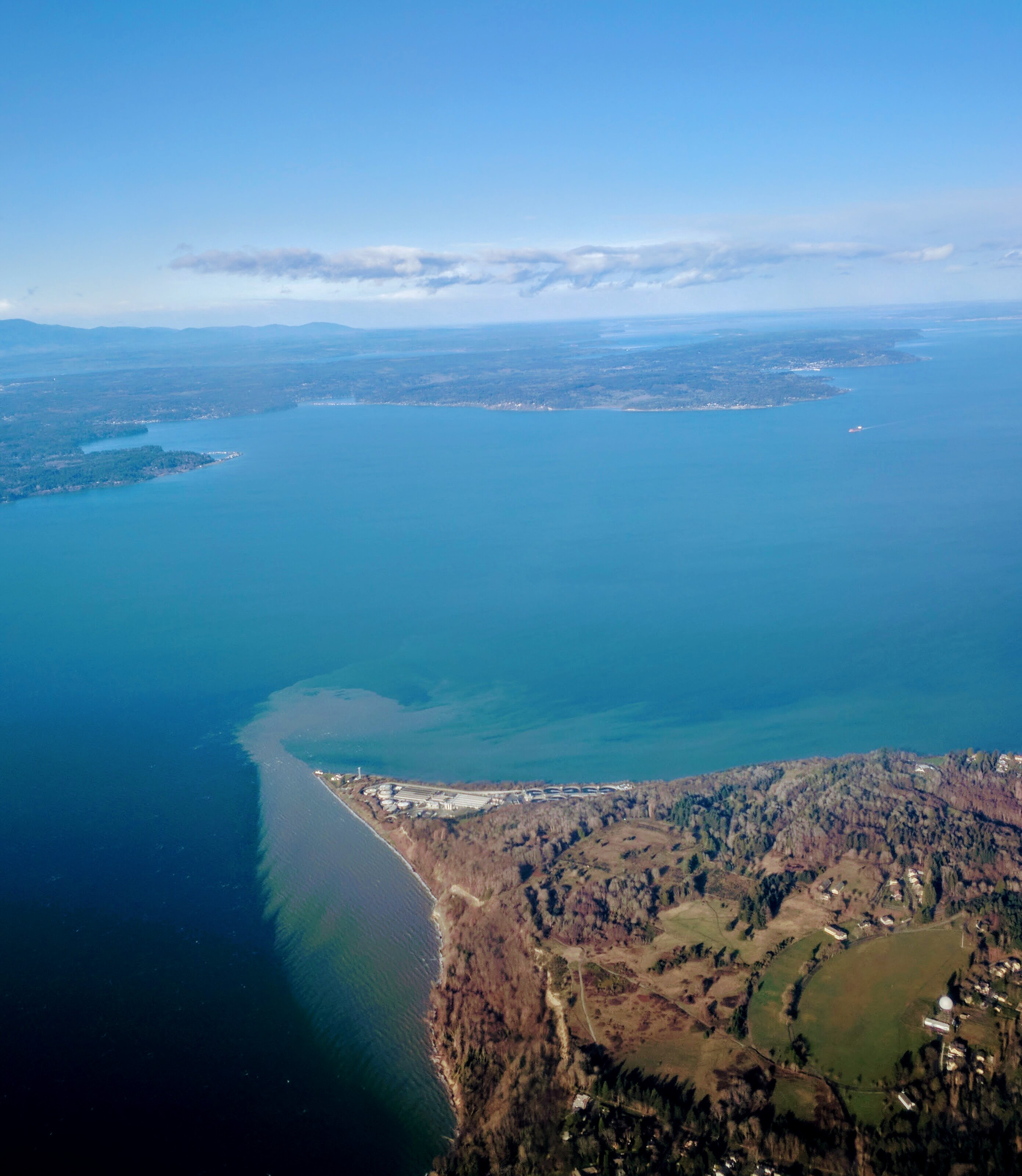
Aerial view of Seattle's West Point neighborhood and the lighthouse

Under current rules, visitors may access the beach on foot by a number of trails, except for people with children under 8, people over 62, and people with physical problems that prevent them from walking long distances. (The lighthouse is located about 1.5 miles from Discovery Park parking lots or from the park's Visitors Center.) Nevertheless, because of the extraordinary beauty of the lighthouse and the rocks and ocean surrounding it, many people drive to the area for picnics, photography, and recreation. Parking spaces exist and are marked, but visitors who wish to park must obtain a permit from the Discovery Park Visitor Center. To ensure parking spaces for permitted visitors and access for emergency vehicles, cars may be ticketed by Seattle Police and towed if they are parked without a permit. King County Wastewater Treatment Division and City of Seattle Parks report problems with excess unpermitted parking that results in access problems for emergency vehicles and into the treatment plant. Emergency resources have been needed to respond to beach fires, illegal fireworks, and gunfire in the beach area. County and City resources have been used to remove abandoned vehicles and graffiti on the beach and on historic buildings and treatment plant walls.

In 2013, King County and Seattle Parks presented the public with a plan to install a security gate that would prevent unauthorized vehicle access. Over half of people providing comment to the County supported this proposal, but others suggested that other options should be explored first. During Summer 2014, King County and Seattle Parks installed improved parking permit signage, additional educational signage to help visitors understand the intent of the Master Plan, measured vehicle traffic to the beach, and scheduled enforcement presence at various times of the day. The results of this evaluation will be presented to the public in November 2014.

A strict parking and towing policy was announced in 2015.
