= West Point Foundry =

- U.S. National Register of Historic Places
- U.S. Historic district
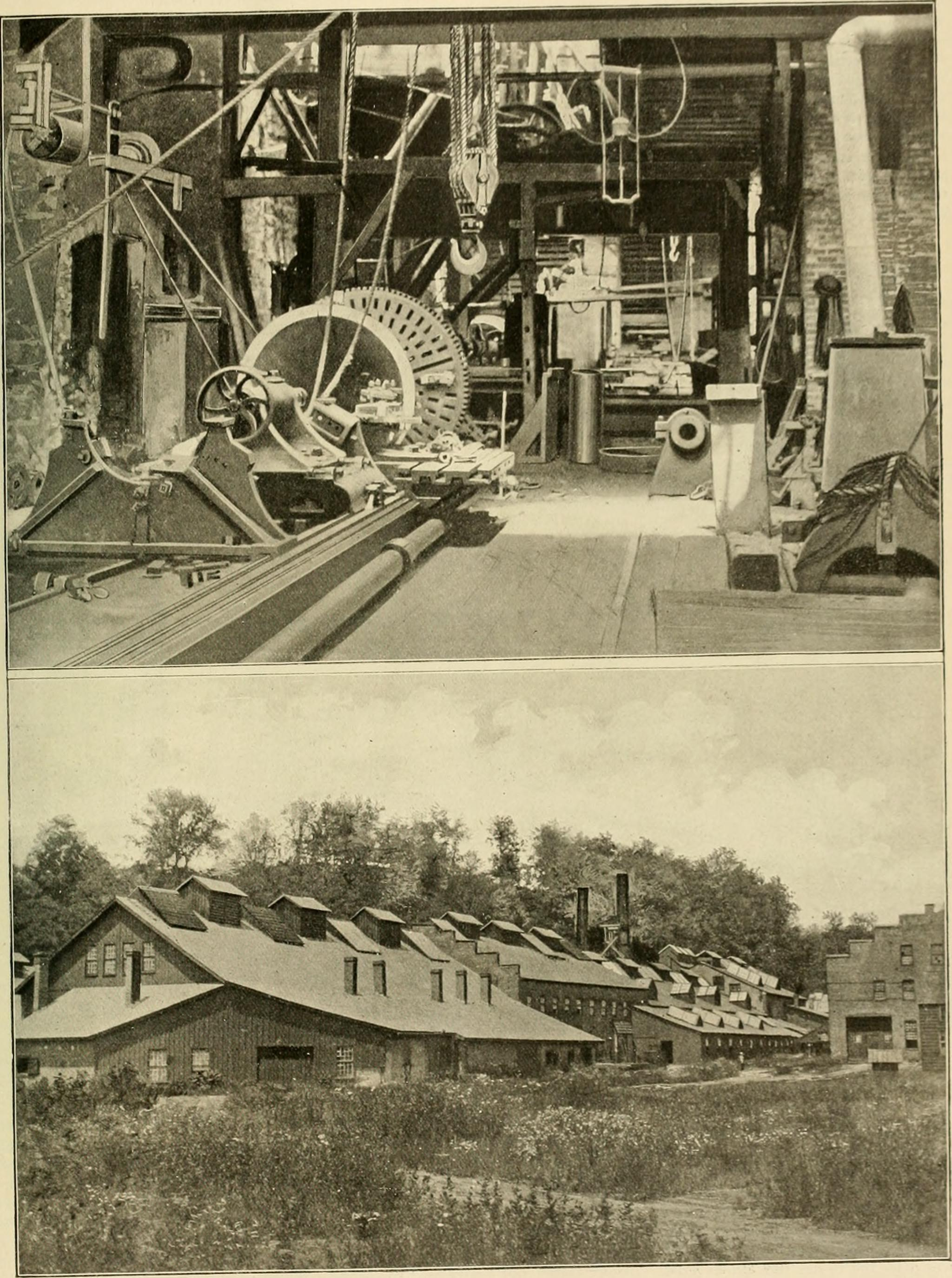
- Scenes of the West Point Foundry in the 1890s

- Location within New York Location within the United States
- Location: 68 Kemble Avenue, Cold Spring, NY 10516
- Nearest city: Beacon
- Coordinates: 41°24′51″N 73°57′22″W
- Area: 93 acres (38 ha)
- NRHP reference No.: 73001250
- Added to NRHP: April 11, 1973

The West Point Foundry was a major American ironworking and machine shop concern, located in Cold Spring, New York, United States. It operated from 1818 to about 1911. Initiated after the War of 1812, it became most famous for its production of Parrott rifle artillery and other munitions during the Civil War, although it also manufactured a variety of iron products for civilian use. The increase of steel making and decreasing demand for cast iron after the Civil War caused it to become bankrupt gradually and cease operations during the early 20th Century.

== History ==
=== Founding and early products ===
The foundry began operation in 1817. Its establishment had been encouraged by President James Madison, who, after the War of 1812, desired domestic foundries to produce artillery. Cold Spring was an ideal site: there were many local iron mines, timber for charcoal to fuel a forge was abundant, and the nearby Margaret's Brook provided water power to drive machinery. The site was guarded by the Federal government's West Point Academy, across the Hudson River, and the river provided transport for finished products.

The West Point Foundry Association was incorporated by Gouverneur Kemble, who was of a merchant family in New York City (his mother's family had associations in Putnam County), and the foundry followed in 1817. Artillery was tested by shooting across the Hudson at the desolate slopes of Storm King Mountain (which would later have to be swept for unexploded ordnance as a result after some of it exploded during a 1999 fire). The platform used for mounting artillery for proofing was uncovered during Superfund work in the early 1990s. Besides artillery, the foundry also produced iron fittings for civilian uses, such as pipe for the New York City water system and shipment to sugar mills in the West Indies. A number of early locomotives were built at the foundry, including the Best Friend of Charleston (the first to be put into commercial service), the West Point (the third built for service in the United States), the DeWitt Clinton (the fourth, and first to operate in New York state), Phoenix, and Experiment.

=== Parrott years and the Civil War ===
In 1835, Captain Robert Parker Parrott, an 1824-graduate of the United States Military Academy at West Point, was appointed as an inspector of ordnance at the foundry for the U.S. Army. The following year he resigned his commission and on October 31, 1836, was appointed superintendent of the foundry. It prospered over his long tenure, and was the site of numerous experiments with artillery and projectiles, culminating in his invention of the Parrott rifle cannon in 1860. In 1843 the foundry also manufactured the USS Spencer, a revenue cutter which was the first iron ship built in the U.S.A.

The foundry was busiest during the American Civil War due to military orders: at that time it had a workforce of 1,400 people and produced 2,000 cannon and three million shells. Parrott also invented an incendiary shell which was used in an 8-inch Parrott rifle cannon (the "Swamp Angel") to bombard Charleston. The importance of the foundry for the war effort can be measured by the fact that President Abraham Lincoln visited and inspected it in June 1862.

The fame of the foundry was such that Jules Verne, for his novel From the Earth to the Moon, chose it as the contractor for the Columbiad, a spaceship-launching cannon.

=== Decline and demise ===
In 1867, Parrott resigned as superintendent, although he continued to experiment with artillery designs until his death in 1877. Business of the foundry decreased due to competition from more modern techniques of iron and steel production. It had discontinued the use of charcoal and begun to purchase coal from Pennsylvania about 1870. However, it was unable to avoid receivership in 1884 and bankruptcy in 1889. It was sold in 1897 to the Cornell brothers, makers of sugar mills, and ceased operation in 1911.

== Site archaeology ==
- West Point Foundry Archeological Site
- U.S. National Register of Historic Places
- U.S. National Historic Landmark District
- Location within New York Location within the United States
- Location: Address Restricted, Cold Spring, New York
- Area: 100 acres (40 ha)
- Built: 1817
- NRHP reference No.: 10000059, 100006260

Significant dates
- Added to NRHP: February 25, 2010
- Designated NHLD: January 13, 2021

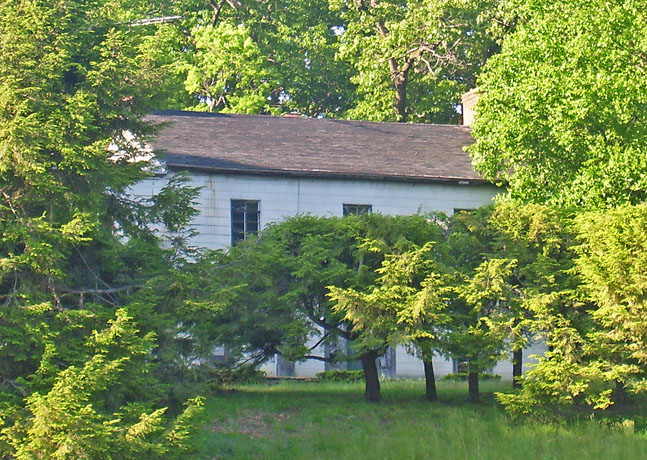
The house of William Kemble, one of the company's founders, seen from the parking lot of the Cold Spring Metro-North station

Of the buildings on the site, only the central office building remains intact; the remainder are in ruins. 87 acres (35 ha) around the site form a preserve owned by Scenic Hudson. It can be visited by a short trail from the nearby Cold Spring Metro-North station. A major archaeological study of the site, funded by Scenic Hudson and performed by Michigan Tech, occurred from 2002 to 2008. The West Point Foundry Archeological Site was listed in the National Register of Historic Places in 2010, and was designated a National Historic Landmark in 2021.

== See also ==
- National Register of Historic Places listings in Putnam County, New York
- List of National Historic Landmarks in New York
