= List of structures on Elliott Bay =

Past and present structures on Elliott Bay in Seattle, Washington, U.S. include:

- piers, wharves, terminals, etc.
- mills and industrial buildings, mostly in the 19th and early 20th centuries.
- trestle bridges, mostly in the 19th and early 20th centuries.
- Bridges of various types along the Spokane Street corridor

Although the focus is on structures built over water, this list also includes some terminals etc. built on fill. Especially in the early years, it can be difficult to make a distinction between the two. "[O]ne of ... [the] basic practices," writes David B. Williams, "was to drive a double row of pilings out from the shoreline, lay timbers across the tops of the pilings to form piers and wharves, and build out atop the wood. They could then dump material under these structures, undertaking the land-making practice known as wharfing out."

It is not possible for a list like this to be complete. In the late 1880s and 1890s, a lack of legal clarity about ownership of lands between the low- and high-tide lines resulted in a massive number of structures on the tideflats, mostly poorly built and short-lived. "The craze for salt water," remarked Judge Thomas Burke, had "broken out again with greater violence than before ... [with] lunatics of high and low degree ... like so many cawing crows on the mudflats." Even today, there are numerous small, anonymous piers and ruins of piers.

The geography of Elliott Bay has changed considerably in the period since people of European ancestry first settled in the Seattle area in the mid-19th century. In particular, virtually all of the Industrial District and Sodo, as well as all of Harbor Island are built on landfill; also, there have been a series of smaller adjustments to the terrain of the Downtown waterfront, including the construction of the Alaskan Way Seawall.

In general, when listing variants of names we have not listed minor variants such as "Yesler Wharf/Yesler's Wharf".

== Before the Great Fire ==
Structures from before the Great Seattle Fire, June 6, 1889.

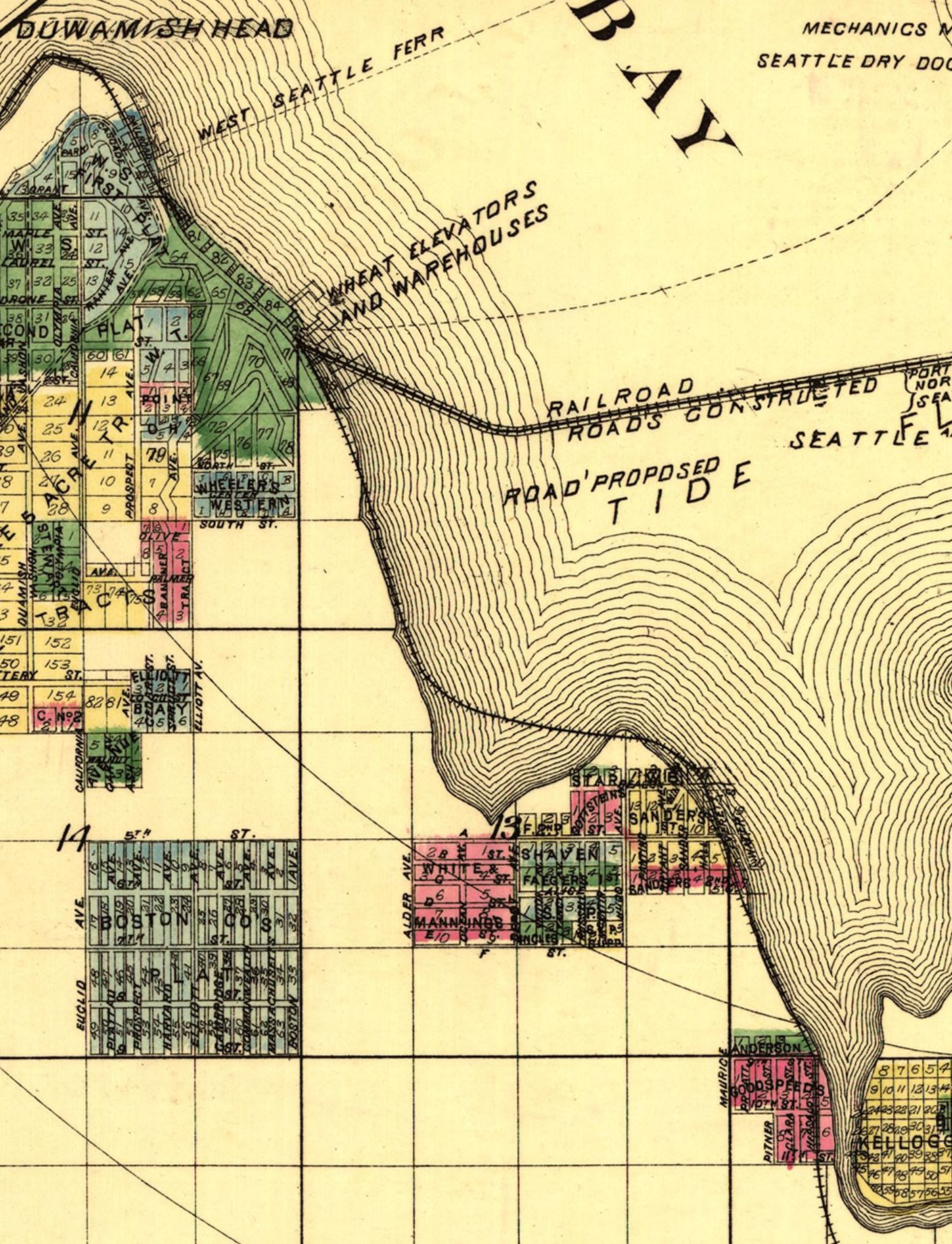
West Seattle shore of Elliott Bay

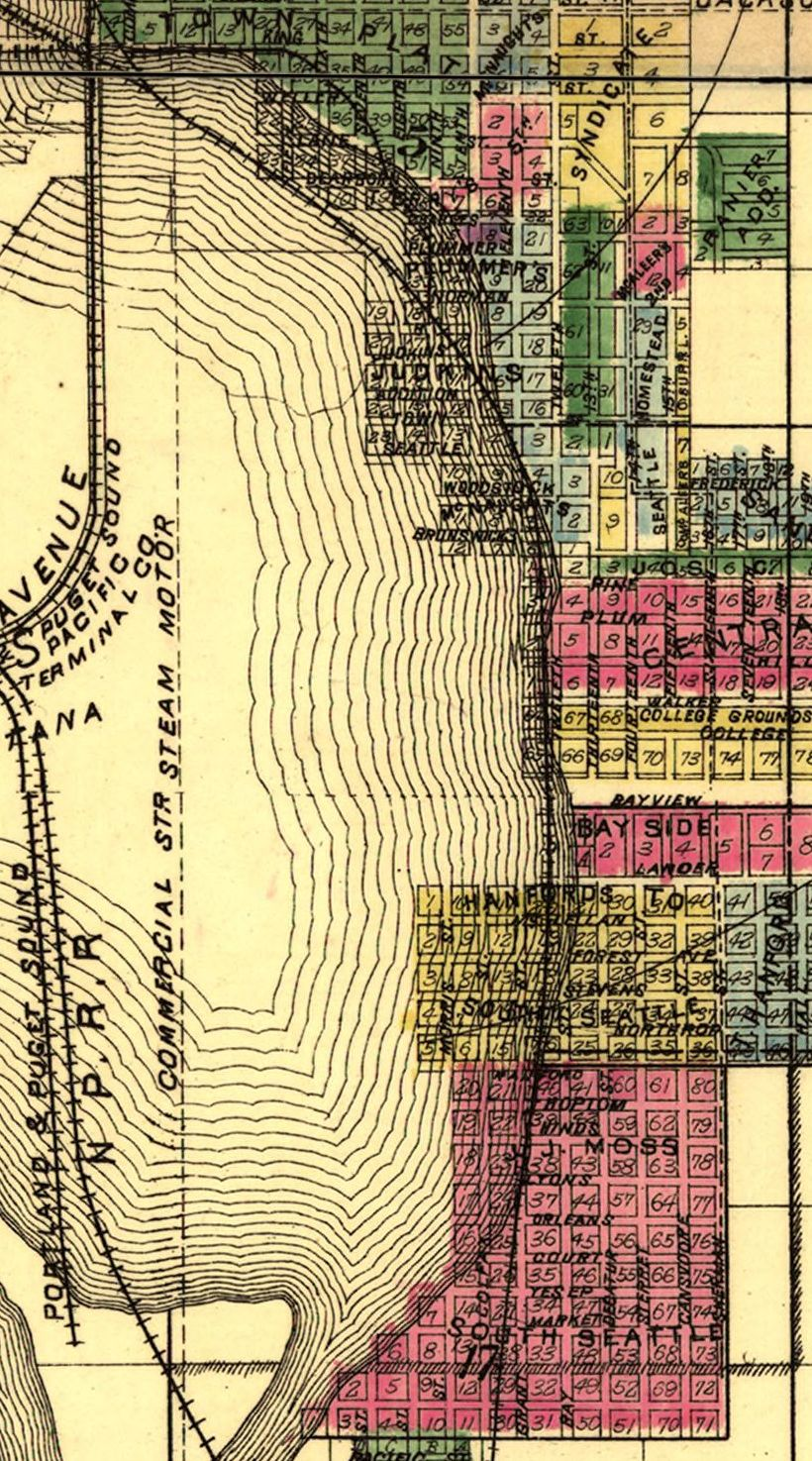
Mudflats south of King Street

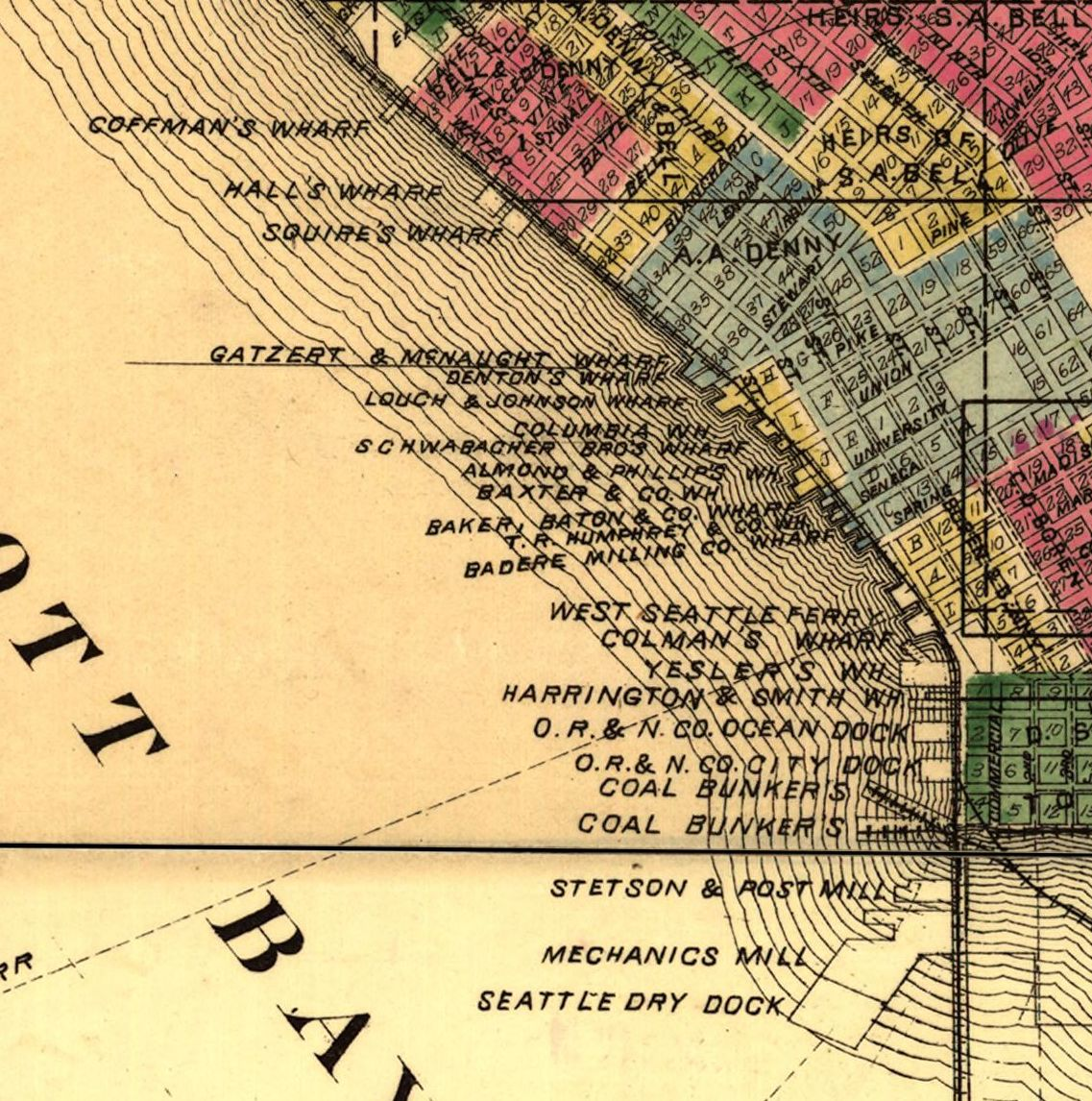
Central Waterfront

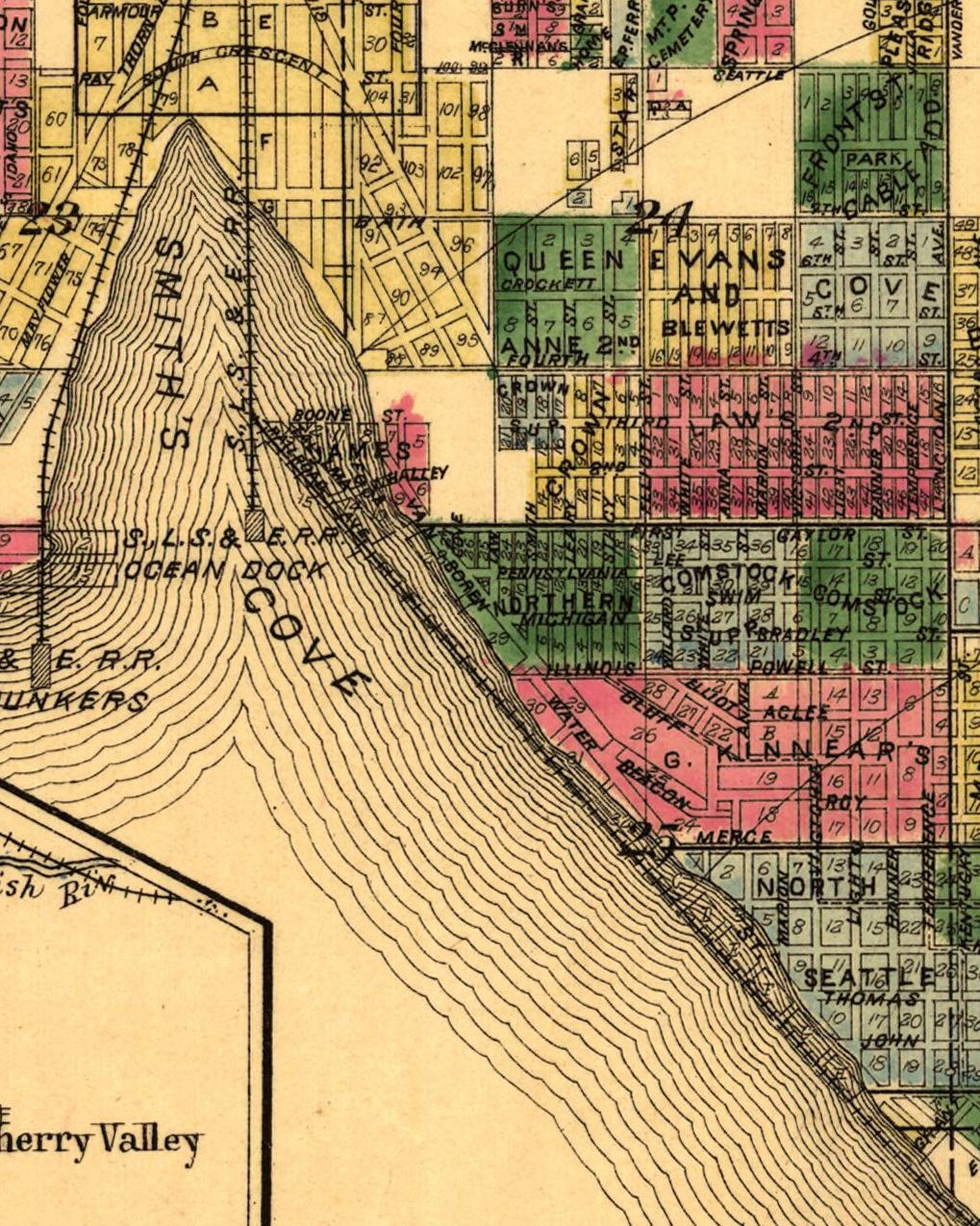
North to Smith Cove

Besides what is listed below, there is the following from Daily Pacific Tribune, January 15, 1877: "Last year the Seattle Coal Company pushed out a new dock, as also the Seattle Gas and Seattle and Walla Walla Railroad Companies." The Seattle and Walla Walla later became the Columbia and Puget Sound. This suggests either slightly earlier dates for the Columbia and Puget Sound piers than given by other sources, or that they were begun in 1876 and not rapidly completed, or that short-lived piers were quickly replaced; similarly for the coal pier (presumably the one at King Street). Conversely, it suggests a slightly later date than given elsewhere for the "Gas Cove" gas works, although this could have been the addition of a pier to an existing operation. Also, that same 1877 article refers to a pier "for Mr. Isaac Parker, in the rear of his lot on Commercial Street [First Avenue South], and immediately alongside the Craig & Hastings Wharf." That suggests two structures south of Yesler's Wharf, neither mentioned below, at least not by those names. Even if the Parker wharf was never built, the Craig & Hastings Wharf appears to have already existed in January 1877.

=== West Seattle ===
| | Name (Alternative names in parentheses) | Image | Year completed | Year destroyed | Type | Location | Notes |
|---|---|---|---|---|---|---|---|
| 1 | (unnamed piers) | Seen in this photo of a 1916 landslide. | (1889 or earlier) | after 1916 | two piers | Near present-day Elm Place West, West Seattle | West Seattle Machine Works, visible at upper left of photo shown here, is described in the 1916 Polk's Directory as located "Alki Av[enue], [at the] f[oo]t [of] Maryland Place", which puts it at the present site of Hamilton Viewpoint Park. In this general area, a 1910 listing of piers in 1907 lists "King & Wing Shipyard (leased of West Seattle Land and Improvement Company)" and "city docks (partially occupied by Calhoun & Krauss Lumber Company)." ("King & Wing" is certainly a typo, should be "King & Winge".) The 1912 Baist maps show four unnamed piers of various sizes in this area; the second from the north shows a "machine shop" on a pier at the foot of Maryland St. |
| 2 | West Seattle Ferry Slip | | 1888 | after 1918 | ferry slip | Near site of today's Seacrest Park | The West Seattle end of the West Seattle Ferry run. The ferry started running December 24, 1888. In 1907 this was still owned by the West Seattle Land and Improvement Company. A 1918 map by the Port of Seattle Commission indicates this as property of the Port: "Port Commission, W. Seattle Ferry Landing". |
| 3 | Wheat Elevators and Warehouses | Seattle Terminal and Railway Elevator Co. circa 1891. | by 1891, possibly earlier | after 1950 | multiple piers | West Seattle, extending south from site of present-day restaurant "Salty's on Alki Beach" (which is not on Alki Beach) | The 1890 Anderson map says "Wheat Elevators and Warehouses" but gives no specifics; given that it shows rail lines in that area that were definitely not yet built, it is possible that this represented structures that were merely proposed or under construction. An 1891 map shows the extensive Seattle Terminal Railway and Elevator Company facility at this site. Salty's is on the site of the Novelty Mill, "a working flour mill from the late 1890s to the mid 1950s." See further discussion of these structures in the section "Since the Great Fire". |

=== Mudflats south of King Street ===
Prior to the Great Seattle Fire, anything south of King Street and west of roughly Eighth Avenue was on mudflats.

| | Name (Alternative names in parentheses) | Image | Year completed | Year destroyed | Type | Location | Notes |
|---|---|---|---|---|---|---|---|
| 1 | Hemrich & Co's Brewery; Bay View Brewery | Pictured in 1901. more images | (1888 or earlier) | between 1901 and 1905 | Bottling plant on pilings | West of Grant Street on east shore of Elliott Bay. | Most of the Hemrich/Bay View facility (today's Old Rainier Brewery) was always on solid ground, but planks on pilings extended past the Columbia and Puget Sound Railroad (C. & P.S.R.R.), then across Grant Street, to the bottling plant pier. Grant Street was roughly along the same route as today's Airport Way S., but was a causeway over water: the area had not yet been filled. Between Grant Street and the shore, also on pilings, was the C. & P.S.R.R. By 1905 the area was solid ground. |
| 2 | Palouse Feed Mill Warehouse | | c.1888 | ? | Feed mill on pilings | East of Grant Street, but west of the C. & P.S. R.R. on east shore of Elliott Bay, "about 1 3/4 miles south of Mill and Front Sts." | Described as "new" in 1888 |
| 3 | Slaughterhouse | | c.1888 | ? | slaughterhouse on pilings | West of Grant Street on east shore of Elliott Bay, "about 1 3/4 miles south of Mill and Front Sts." | Described as "being built" in 1888 |
| 4 | McDonald & Rice's Planing Mill | | (by 1888) | (after 1888) | Pier with planing mill at end | Between Judkins and B Streets, extending across C. & P.S. R.R. and Grant Street on east shore of Elliott Bay. | The 1888 Sanborn map notes that the mill is "not in operation...building and mach[iner]y becoming impaired...Tatum & Bowen (owners)". The map shows over a dozen structures on a complex of connected piers, with the mill being the farthest from dry land, some 200 feet (61 m) from shore. This is right in the path of today's Interstate 5, with the mill falling roughly along the line of Royal Brougham Way. |
| 5 | "Gas Cove" gas works | | 1873 | ? | gas works with pier | south of Jackson, between Fourth and Fifth Avenues | Seattle's first gas works was built partly on land and partly on a pier extending south from Jackson Street over the salt water that became known as "Gas Cove". Fourth and Fifth Avenues were then known as Fifth and Sixth Avenue, respectively. |
| 6 | Mechanics Wharf | | by 1875 | by 1889 | | south of King Street, foot of what was then Second Street and is now Occidental Avenue South | |
| 7 | Atkin's Wharf | | by 1875 | by 1889 | wharf | south of King Street on line of Commercial Avenue (later First Avenue South) | |
| 8 | (no known name for the planked area as a whole) | | by 1884 | 1889 | planked area over mudflats | south of King Street, east of Stetson & Post Mill | The 1884 Sanborn map shows several buildings of the Hall and Paulson Furniture Manufactury on planks extending about a block south from King Street, extending from Second Avenue in the east to the railroad tracks beyond the line of Commercial Street (later First Avenue South) in the west; on the other side of the tracks was the Stetson & Post Mill. The 1888 Sanborn map shows this much expanded. Hall and Paulson has packed in more buildings and has extended south onto another small pier; extensive C. & P.S. R.R. rail infrastructure has been added between Commercial and Second Avenues in the west and Third Avenue in the east. The area extending roughly a block-and-a-half south of King Street includes a railway turntable, a locomotive house, car shop, machine shop, etc. A distinct rail line on planks continues south several blocks roughly along the line of Second Avenue, where the Oregon Improvement Company Mill is located on another large planked pier. (The 1890 Anderson map does not detail this area.) This either incorporated or replaced Atkin's Wharf. |

=== Central Waterfront ===
| | Name (Alternative names in parentheses) | Image | Year completed | Year destroyed | Type | Location | Notes |
|---|---|---|---|---|---|---|---|
| 1 | (no known name for the pier as a whole) | Seattle Dry Dock and Ship Building Company, circa 1889; however, this may be a picture of the post-Fire replacement for this dock. | 1888 | 1889 | pier | Between Plummer and Lane Streets | Structures on pier (from land outward): Mechanics Mill; Seattle Dry Dock; The east edge of this was Railroad Avenue, running due south from King Street, a block west of Commercial Street (today's First Avenue South), along the line of today's Alaskan Way South. Very little of Plummer Street remains anywhere as of 2019; it is a block south of Charles Street. Seattle Dry Dock and Ship Building Company was owned by the Moran Brothers and Bailey Gatzert. The Moran Brothers had been repairing boats in Seattle since 1882. At the beginning of 1888 they built this sectional floating dock at the foot of Charles Street on the tideflats. They would go on to found a major shipyard after the fire. |
| 2 | Stetson & Post Mill | Stetson & Post board-making facility, 1882 more images | 1882 | 1889 | pier and sawmill | Between Lane and King | There were various structures on this pier over time, and there were multiple occasions when much of the pier burned and was rebuilt: 1879, 1885, and 1887, before the major destruction of the Great Seattle Fire (after which nonetheless another Yesler Wharf was built and lasted slightly over a decade). The east edge of this was Railroad Avenue, running due south from King Street, a block west of Commercial Street (today's First Avenue South), along the line of today's Alaskan Way South. |
| 3 | King Street Coal Wharf (Coal Bunkers) | Coal wharf c. 1889 more images | 1878 | 1889 | Pier / coal bunkers | Foot of King Street | The wharf consisted of a pair of coal wharves/piers/bunkers, one extending due west, the other angled about 30 degrees north of west. |
| 4 | Plummer's Dock | Plummer's store and dock, 1860 | by 1860 | by 1884 | Pier/dock with small structure | foot of Main | pier with large shed |
| 5 | Oregon Railroad and Navigation Company City Dock (O.R.& N. Co. City Dock, Columbia and Puget Sound Railroad's City Dock, C. & P.S. R.R. Co's City Dock Warehouse) | more images: (City Dock), (Ocean Dock) | (1884 or earlier) | 1889 | Pier/wharf/warehouse | Between Jackson & Main | pier with large shed |
| 6 | Oregon Railroad and Navigation Company Ocean Dock (O.R.& N. Co. Ocean Dock, Columbia and Puget Sound Railroad's Ocean Dock, C. & P.S. R.R. Co's Ocean Dock Warehouse) | more images: (City Dock), (Ocean Dock) | (1884 or earlier) | 1889 | Pier/wharf/warehouse | Between Main & Washington | pier with large shed |
| 7 | Stone & Burnett's Wharf | | by 1875 | after 1875 | | south of Washington Street | |
| 8 | in 1875: Crawford & Harrington's Wharf (by 1884: Harrington & Smith's Wharf) | Harrington's is the slim wharf with a single structure at the end. | by 1875 | 1889 | pier/wharf | Just north of Washington Street, foot of Washington | A Seattle Public Library Special Collections photo caption refers to a "Harrington and Smith" dock at the "foot of Yesler Way" (presumably a minor error; certainly Yesler Wharf was at Yesler) that burned July 26, 1879. The caption of an 1882 Theodore Peiser photo on the University of Washington Libraries site suggests that Crawford's and Harrington's Wharves were distinct. However, Crawford and Harrington were also partners in a store on Commercial Street (later First Avenue South), immediately north of Dexter Horton's bank, later—like the wharf—Harrington and Smith. Given the sign "Talbot Coal Yard" in that Peiser photo, Crawford and Harrington's Wharf must be the same thing as "Talbot Coal Dock". |
| 9 | Yesler's Wharf | Map; east (land) at top. Yesler's is the wharf in rear with a large number of structures. more images | 1853 (stub), 1854 (small pier), 1859 (first extension) | 1889 | pier/wharf | Foot of Mill Street, later Yesler Way | Begun as a stubby pier when Yesler set up his mill, the pier was extended in 1859. In 1875, a branch to the northwest was added, initially as a coaling pier but later serving other purposes. Significant structures, roughly from shore outward, 1888: Moran Bros. Foundry; Mechanics Mill; Mach[iner]y Depot; Seattle Boiler Works; Soda Water Fac[tory]; Soda Water Mfy. Storage; Ice House & produce building; spur running from the middle of the dock to the northwest; Durie's Hay W[are]ho[u]s[e]; (various other storage buildings); Lime Ho[use]; Yesler's Freight W[are]ho[use] & sign paint[in]g; Salt Loft & W[are]ho[use]; (passenger rail terminal); Freight House; All from |
| 10 | (floating boathouses) | Budlong's and other boathouses, c. 1886; Frye Opera House in the background. | by 1886 | c. 1888? | floating boathouses | Foot of Columbia | From here north, the 1888 Sanborn maps show an extensive planked area over the water, partially interrupted at Madison and Spring Streets, but extending as far north as a bit past Seneca Street, so it is a bit difficult to entirely separate out the next several piers. Some of that planking, and a few small buildings, seems to exist at the foot of Columbia as early as the 1884 Sanborn map. At that time, this is shown as the northern terminus of the C. & P.S. R.R.; there is no connection north to the tracks that would constitute Railroad Avenue north of this. One of these boathouses was the pre-fire Budlong's Boathouse, which existed by 1886. |
| 11 | Colman's Hay Warehouse ("Coleman's [sic] Hay W.Ho.") | | (1888 or earlier) | c. 1888? | pier/wharf | Foot of Marion | warehouse |
| 12 | Colman's Wharf | The pier at right without a shed is Colman's Wharf; the one with multiple buildings is Yesler's. | c. 1885 - c. 1888 | 1889 | pier/wharf | Between Columbia and Marion | |
| 13 | Seattle Lumber & Commercial Cos. Sawmill (Seattle Lumber & Commercial Mill Co., Commercial Mills) | | (1884 or earlier) | (No later than 1889) | pier/wharf | Between Marion and Madison | Sawmill and lumber yard. The 1888 Sanborn map shows this considerably expanded from the 1884 map; in particular, a pier with "Commercial Mills No. 2" extends further out away from shore. |
| 14 | Pontius; Stewart & Maddocks | | 1877-1878 | (1888 or earlier) | pier/wharf | Foot of Spring; From Madison to Seneca | A January 1877 article in the Daily Pacific Tribune says that work had begun on what was to be "the largest wharf in the city… From Madison Street to Seneca, a distance of 546 feet… reaching west… 60 feet, and from that will extend two long piers… [one at Madison] built by Mr. R. W. Pontius and… [one at] Seneca by J.T. S[t]ewart and M. B. Maddocks. The [546-foot wharf] along the bank, will be owned by Messrs. M. Stacey, Amos Brown, John S. Hill, and M. B. Maddocks, and will be used as a roadway…" Two weeks later, the same newspaper described the Stewart & Maddocks pier as "well nigh finished" and the 60-foot-wide planking along the shore as to be "commenced this week", with the Pontius wharf expected to be completed the following month. |
| 15 | West Seattle Ferry Slip | | 1888 | 1889 | ferry slip | Foot of Marion | The Downtown end of the West Seattle Ferry run. The ferry started running December 24, 1888. |
| 16 | (no known name ) | | between 1876 and 1878 | after 1878 | pier | between Madison and Spring | |
| 17 | (no known name ) | | (between 1884 and 1888) | (1889 or earlier) | planking | between Madison and Spring | The 1888 Sanborn map shows several structures here. Roughly from south to north: Carp[ente]r on first floor, Commercial Mill Glazing on second; "Bl. Sm. & Wagon shop" on first floor, vacant second; Jones & Hubbel Hay & Feed W[are]Ho[use]; Ice cream factory; Shoudy, Perkins & Co. Hay W[are]Ho[use]; Ship carp[enter]; All from |
| 18 | (no known name ) | | (1884 or earlier) | 1889 | pier | Foot of Spring | Visible but unnamed on maps showing 1884 and 1889 configuration. No way to know for certain whether this remained the same structure. 1888 Sanborn map shows planking between Madison and Spring that would seem to eliminate this as a distinct structure. |
| 19 | Scott's Wharf (Badere Milling Co. Wharf,) | | (1884 or earlier) | 1889 | pier/wharf | Between Spring & Seneca | The 1884 Sanborn map shows an unmamed wharf; 1888 Sanborn shows Scott's Wharf and the 1890 Anderson (which shows a pre-Fire configuration) shows Badere Milling Co. Wharf. Some of these could have been distinct structures in the same location a few years apart. The 1884 Sanborn map shows a boiler works and some unnamed warehouses. The 1888 Sanborn map shows (roughly from south to north): Baxters Baled Hay W[are]H[ouse], bran and feed; 2 Canadian Pacific R.R. freight warehouses; Several facilities for the storage of hay (one sharing with the railroad warehouses); All from |
| 20 | T.R. Humphrey & Co. Wharf | | ? | 1889 | pier/wharf | Between Seneca & University | This may or may not be an extension of the structure shown on the 1884 Sanborn map and/or it may be the same structure shown on the 1888 Sanborn map. The 1884 map shows a small pier at this location with "Star B[ui]ld[in]g" built at the foot of the pier. The 1888 map shows a continuation of the planking that extended north from around Marion Street (though there is a partial interruption at Seneca Street, where there were some openings in the planking). Going roughly from land to open water, structures on the pier included: Broom shop / boat factory /tenem[en]ts; "Pulling Scur'g & C."; Boat shop; "S.P. Lod'g / Steam dyeing"; "Pett Drying"; All from |
| 21 | Baker, Baton & Co. Wharf | | c. 1888 | 1889 | pier/wharf | Between Seneca & University | |
| 22 | Baxter & Co. Wharf | | (between 1884 and 1888) | 1889 | pier/wharf | Between University & Union | The 1888 Sanborn map shows a shorter wharf with the Seattle Soap Works, which may or may not be part of the longer pier shown on the Anderson map. |
| 23 | Almond & Phillip's Wharf | | (between 1884 and 1888) | 1889 | pier/wharf | Between University & Union | Almond & Philips Foundry |
| 24 | Schwabacher's Wharf (Schwabacher Bro's Wharf; Schwabacher Dock) | Schwabacher's Wharf circa 1900 more images | 1888 | c. 1962 | pier/wharf | Foot of Union | The 1888 Sanborn map shows an unnamed plank wharf at this location, with no structures, presumably Schwabacher's Wharf under construction. See below for post-Great-Fire history. |
| 25 | Pike Street Coal Pier, S.C.&T.Co's Wharf, S.C.&T. Coal Wharf | Detail from an 1878 bird's-eye map. | 1872 | abandoned 1878 | coaling pier | foot of Pike Street | This pier was connected by a roughly 1 mile (1.6 km) railway to Lake Union. More than 200 feet (61 m) long and 70 feet (21 m) high. The end of the pier collapsed June 11, 1877, although it was partially repaired and continued to be used until it was abandoned when the King Street Coal Wharf was built. |
| 26 | Columbia Wharf (Columbia Canning Co. Wharf) | Left of center: Columbia Canning Co. c. 1888 or slightly earlier | (between 1884 and 1888) | ? | pier/wharf | Between Union & Pike | |
| 27 | Louch & Johnson Wharf | | (1889 or earlier) | ? | pier/wharf | Between Pike & Pine | |
| 28 | Denton's Wharf | | (1889 or earlier) | ? | pier/wharf | Between Stewart & Virginia | |
| 29 | Gatzert & McNaught Wharf (in 1889); McNaught's (in 1899) | | (1889 or earlier) | After 1899 | pier/wharf | Between Stewart & Virginia | |
| 30 | Squire's Wharf | | c.1888 | after 1899 | pier/wharf | Between Stewart & Virginia | |
| 31 | Hall's Wharf; (possibly distinct) Mannings Wharf) | | (1888 or earlier) | after 1899 | pier/wharf | Between Wall & Vine | |

=== North to Smith Cove ===
As discussed below in section Trestle (and other) bridges, italics indicate structures shown on one or more maps, but little other evidence that they actually existed.

| | Name (Alternative names in parentheses) | Image | Year completed | Year destroyed | Type | Location | Notes |
|---|---|---|---|---|---|---|---|
| 1 | Seattle Barrel Manufactury Pier | | 1880 | ? | Pier | Foot of Lake Street (now Broad Street), Belltown. | The Seattle Barrel Manufactury (a.k.a. Seattle Barrel Manufacturing Company) stood on dry land between Lake (now Broad Street) and ran northwest along the shore past Eagle to Grant (now Bay), west of West St.(now Western Avenue). The pier was at the south end of their shoreline. This is now entirely filled, and is roughly the eastern half of the Olympic Sculpture Park, between Elliott (roughly the old shoreline) and Western. This may or may not have been the same structure as Coffman's Wharf, attested a few years later. |
| 2 | Coffman's Wharf | | (1889 or earlier) | ? | pier/wharf | Foot of Lake, now Broad | |
| 3 | Seattle, Lake Shore and Eastern Railway Ocean Dock (S., L.S. & E. R.R. Ocean Dock) | | (1889 or earlier?) | ? | railroad pier | Smith Cove | These correspond to piers 38/88 and 39/89. Daryl C. McClary implies that although these appears on the 1890 Anderson map, they were not actually built at that time, and instead were part of the Great Northern Railway's construction of a route north out of Seattle in the early 1890s. |
| 4 | Seattle, Lake Shore and Eastern Railway Coal Bunkers (S., L.S. & E. R.R. Coal Bunkers) | | (1889 or earlier?) | ? | railroad pier/coal bunkers | just west of Smith Cove | These correspond to piers 38/88 and 39/89. Daryl C. McClary implies that although these appears on the 1890 Anderson map, they were not actually built at that time, and instead were part of the Great Northern Railway's construction of a route north out of Seattle in the early 1890s. |

== Ballast Island ==
| | Name (Alternative names in parentheses) | Image | Year completed | Year destroyed | Type | Location | Notes |
|---|---|---|---|---|---|---|---|
| 1 | Ballast Island | Ballast Island more images | 1880s, possibly earlier | before 1900 | artificial island | just offshore near South Washington Street | Ballast Island, developed more or less by accident starting in the 1880s and survived into the post-Fire era, from ships dumping their ballast. During that time, it was home to numerous displaced people, including many Native Americans. This was later the site of the circa 1900 Pier A, owned by the Pacific Coast Company; part of the remainder of Ballast Island was the site of a brick railroad station for the Columbia and Puget Sound Railroad, completed 1905, also owned by owned by the Pacific Coast Company. A present-day historical marker places Ballast Island at the intersection of Alaskan Way South and South Washington Street. |

== Trestle (and other) bridges ==
Italics indicate structure shown on one or more maps, but little other evidence that they actually existed. As Matthew Klingle has written, "paper railroads... crisscrossed Puget Sound, routes planned and licensed but never built..."

| | Name (Alternative names in parentheses) | Image | Year completed | Year destroyed | Type | Location | Notes |
|---|---|---|---|---|---|---|---|
| 1 | Portland & Puget Sound Railroad / Union Pacific trestle | | Never built | N/A | rail trestle | West Seattle, Alki Beach to Duwamish Head and beyond | The 1890 Anderson map shows this as a rail line coming in from the south along the Puget Sound coast, cutting inland near Alki Point, then continuing around Duwamish Head, coming onto land again and ending in the harbor area a bit south of the ferry terminal. However, while it is possible that some rights of way were secured, this line was never built. |
| 2 | Seattle & Southern Railroad Trestles | | ? | ? | multiple railroad trestles | Various trestles over Puget Sound | The 1890 Anderson map shows this as a rail line close to the shoreline running slightly east of south from the West Seattle wheat elevators and warehouses, crossing relatively open water (now filled) roughly along the line of Spokane Street to Pigeon Point, and continuing slightly east of south, partly on trestle over water and partly on land, to roughly Kellogg Island, then continuing in a similar direction on land. This is on the 1890 Anderson map, but may not yet have been built. There are few, if any, references to a "Seattle & Southern Railroad" as anything beyond the planning stage. At least one of these references seems to preclude it being an existing railroad in Seattle in 1889-1890. |
| 3 | Railroad Avenue | On a planked area over water near Pioneer Square in the 1910s. On the Central Waterfront, just south of Broad Street in 1934. Near Smith Cove in the 1910s. more images | created by ordinance 1887, parts by October 1887;, cross-bay trestle c. 1890; all by 1893. | ? | multiple railroad trestles | Various trestles over Elliott Bay | By October 1887, the Seattle, Lake Shore and Eastern Railway (S., L.S. & E. R.R.) was running on this line on piers just offshore, from the Yesler's Wharf area north to Smith Cove just north of the S., L.S. & E. R.R. Ocean Dock, from which the line continued through Interbay, Ballard, Brooklyn (soon to be the University District and beyond along the shore of Lake Washington. Farther south, the 1890 Anderson map (which, as indicated above, shows rail lines that were not yet completed), shows Railroad Avenue beginning on the West Seattle shore of the bay near the wheat elevators and warehouses, heading roughly east across the bay, then turning to run due north to King Street, a block west of Commercial Street (today's First Avenue South), along the line of today's Alaskan Way South, where it meets the abovementioned line opened in 1887. According to the 1890 Anderson map, this line carried the Portland & Puget Sound Railroad (which appears never to have been built), Northern Pacific Railway's Seattle Terminal Railway, and Seattle & Montana Railroad, an enterprise of James J. Hill's that began construction in May 1890 with construction north of Seattle, incorporated the S., L.S. & E. R.R., and began running north from Seattle October 12, 1891, providing a link to the Canadian Pacific Railway. The east–west line across the bay was completed by 1893. A map from that year shows two significant structures built adjoining the trestle in otherwise open water: P.H. McMaster Shingle Mill, south of the Downtown waterfront, at the turn in the trestle.; American Lumber Co's Shingle Mill, west of that, a bit east of the middle of the bay. |
| 4 | Seattle and Walla Walla Railroad trestle (after 1880 Columbia and Puget Sound Railroad trestle (1)) | | March 7, 1877 | abandoned 1881 | railroad trestle | Trestle over tideflats | This trestle built by Joe Surber ran south from the King Street Coal Wharf, carrying trains through what has now been filled as part of Seattle's Industrial District; the lines continued to the coal mines at Renton, Washington. It was short-lived because shipworms attacked the pilings. Henry Villard's Oregon Improvement Company bought the Seattle and Walla Walla in 1880 and renamed it the Columbia and Puget Sound Railroad. |
| 5 | Columbia and Puget Sound Railroad trestle (2) | This 1881 photo shows a trestle along the C. & P.S. R.R.(2) route hugging the shore; the C. & P.S. R.R.(3) route is not yet built. more images | 1881 | ? | railroad trestle | Trestle over tideflats | Coming out of the King Street Coal Wharf, this trestle ran mainly south just off of the then-shore at the foot of Beacon Hill, carrying C. & P.S. R.R. trains through what has now been filled as part of Seattle's Industrial District, eventually re-joining the prior C. & P.S. R.R. route. |
| 6 | Columbia and Puget Sound Railroad trestle (3) | This pre-Fire photo shows a pair of trestles along the C. & P.S. R.R.(3) route, as well as one along the C. & P.S. R.R.(2) route. more images | (between 1881 and 1889) | ? | railroad trestle | Trestle over tideflats | Coming out of the King Street Coal Wharf, this trestle rapidly turned south over the mudflats, carrying C. & P.S. R.R. trains on a line not far from today's First Avenue South through what has now been filled as part of Seattle's Industrial District, eventually re-joining the prior C. & P.S. R.R. routes. According to the 1890 Anderson map, the northern portion of this coincided with Railroad Avenue over the mudflats, separating when Railroad Avenue headed west across the bay; from there, this trestle ran slightly east of south, carrying Columbia and Puget Sound Railroad (C. & P.S. R.R.) and Northern Pacific trains. |

Since roughly 1900 there have been a series of bridges of various types running east–west roughly along the line of Spokane Street; see List of bridges in Seattle.

== Since the Great Fire ==
=== West Seattle ===
| | Name (Alternative names in parentheses) | Image | Year completed | Year destroyed | Type | Location | Notes |
|---|---|---|---|---|---|---|---|
| 1 | Alki–Manchester Ferry Dock | | 1925 | 1935 | ferry dock | Alki Beach | This is presumably the substantial pier visible very near the west end of today's Alki Beach Park in two 1929 aerial photographs of Alki. |
| 2 | (unnamed piers) | | by 1918 | after 1918 | several narrow piers | between Alki bathing beach and Duwamish Head | A 1918 Port of Seattle map shows three narrow, unnamed piers between the Municipal Bathing Beach (Alki Beach) and Duwamish Head, as well as several others around Alki Point facing onto Puget Sound, outside Elliott Bay. One such pier is visible in the distance in the third photo of a Seattle Now & Then article by Paul Dorpat and Jean Sherrard. |
| 3 | Luna Park | Luna Park, 1910. more images | 1907 | 1913/ 1931 | amusement park on pilings, natatorium | Duwamish Head | Construction began in 1906; the amusement park was open 1906-1913; the natatorium remained open until it was destroyed by arson, April 14, 1931. A small portion of the former Luna Park site is now solid land behind a seawall, as part of the line of parks along the West Seattle waterfront; there is a 2.5-ton anchor at this site. A 1910 listing of Seattle docks refers to the "Mexico street dock (used by Luna Park; this park is built on piles extending into the harbor, the site being leased of the West Seattle Land Improvement Company)." |
| 4 | (unnamed piers) | King and Winge Boat Shop, circa 1906 | In 1918, in this area, there were at least two identifiable structures and a third unnamed pier. From north to south: King & Winge Shipbuilding Co.; City of Seattle Marine Iron Works; unnamed pier. See further discussion in the section "Before the Great Fire", above. West Seattle was not directly affected by the fire. | | | | |
| 5 | West Seattle Ferry Slip | West Seattle Ferry Slip circa 1920. | A 1918 Harbor Department map calls this "Port of Seattle West Seattle Terminal". See further discussion in the section "Before the Great Fire", above. West Seattle was not directly affected by the fire. | | | | |
| 6 | (unnamed piers) | The northernmost of these piers is visible at right in this c. 1911 photo (centered on the ferry slip). A sign on the building in the pier says "Elliott Bay Yacht & Engine Co. Inc" | by 1912 | after 1912 | piers | between West Seattle Ferry Slip & Seattle Yacht Club | The 1912 Baist map shows an unnamed pier adjoining the south side of the West Seattle Ferry Slip, then three unnamed piers (the northernmost labeled "Boat Wks." as you go south toward the Yacht Club. In this general area, a 1910 listing of piers in 1907 lists the "Ericson Dock and Shingle Mill" and the "Arrow Lumber and Shingle Company dock," both described as "leased of West Seattle Land and Improvement Company." A 1918 Harbor Department map shows all piers here as being within the anchorage of the Yacht Club. |
| 7 | King County Water Taxi terminal (originally Elliott Bay Water Taxi terminal Seacrest Pier) | King County Water Taxi terminal, 2015 more images | 1997 | extant | dock | Seacrest Park | The Elliott Bay Water Taxi, started its run from Downtown to West Seattle in 1997. In April 2009, the route was renamed from the Elliott Bay Water Taxi to the King County Water Taxi, and dock was upgraded. |
| 8 | Seattle Yacht Club (Yacht Anchorage) | | 1892 | 1918 | float & boathouse; clubhouse on shore | Location is now Seacrest Park. | The 1892-1918 Yacht Club site was just south of the terminal for today's King County Water Taxi. Since 1920, the club has been located in Montlake. |
| 9 | Novelty Mill (Novelty (flour) mills, Novelty Milling Co.); Novelty Mill Co. | Novelty Mill in the 1890s, looking south with Seattle Terminal and Railway Elevator Co. in background. more images | 1893 or 1894 | 1950s? | piers and building | West Seattle, site of present-day restaurant "Salty's on Alki Beach" (which is not on Alki Beach) | Salty's is on part of the site of the Novelty Mill, "a working flour mill from the late 1890s to the mid 1950s." |
| 10 | Salty's on Alki Beach (before 1985, Beach Broiler) | Salty's, seen from the water, 2015 | before 1948 as Beach Broiler | extant | West Seattle | restaurant largely on pilings | Salty's is on part of the site of the Novelty Mill, "a working flour mill from the late 1890s to the mid 1950s." |
| 11 | Seattle Terminal Railway and Elevator Co. (in 1907: Northern Pacific Railway grain and coal elevators; in 1913 and 1918: West Seattle Elevator; in 1918: Northern Pacific Railway Grain Elevator and Wharf) | Seattle Terminal and Railway Elevator Co. circa 1891. more images | by 1891 | after 1918 | multiple piers | West Seattle | It not clear whether this predates the Great Fire of June 1889. The 1890 Anderson map says "Wheat Elevators and Warehouses" but gives no specifics; given that it shows rail lines in that area that were definitely not yet built, it is possible that this represented structures that were merely proposed or under construction. An 1891 map shows the extensive Seattle Terminal Railway and Elevator Company facility at this site. This is the location of the "maze of old decaying and barnacle encrusted piers" between Salty's and Jake Block Park depicted in a 2014 YouTube video. |
| 12 | "Coal Bunkers" | | before 1918 | after 1918 | coal bunkers | Immediately northeast of West Seattle Elevators | Possibly Pacific Coast Coal Co. There was apparently a second Pacific Coast Coal Co. bunker (besides the one on the east shore of the bay) somewhere in West Seattle as of 1913. |
| 13 | Pier 2 (in 1912: Colmans Creosote Plant; in 1913, 1918: Colman Creosoting Works or Coleman Creosoting Works) | Fire at the creosote pier, 1947 Barges at Pier 2 in 2010 This recreational pier photographed 2019 in Jack Block Park is actually the east side of the former main slip of the creosoting plant. more images | 1909 | extant | railway pier | north of Jack Block Park, Industrial District West | There is quite a bit of disagreement in sources as to whether this is properly Colman or Coleman. However, File:Panoramic view of Harbor Island, between 1912 and 1917 (MOHAI 5199).jpg clearly shows a sign on the roof saying "Colman Creosoting Works". North edge of Industrial District West. A rail spur runs north under a bridge in Jack Block Park to reach this small pier northwest of Terminal 5. The 1912 Baist map shows "Colmans Creosote Plant" at this location. A 2004 EPA report reports successive owners of the creosote plant: J.M. Coleman Company (1909); West Coast Wood Preserving Company (jointly owned by J. M. Coleman Co. and Pacific Creosoting) (1930); Baxter-Wyckoff Company (1959); Wyckoff Company (1964); Pacific Sound Resources (1991); Port of Seattle (1994) In 1963 the Baxter-Wyckoff property included an "East Log Wharf," "North Piers and Marine Slip," and a "West Barge Slip." Crowley Maritime's PSAVL Hydro-Train ("Puget Sound Alaska Van Lines"), after 1969 Alaska Hydro-Train, used Pier 2 from its inception in 1963 until early 1971. Railroad cars would "roll onto 400-foot steel barges destined for Alaska." Crowley retired the Alaska Hydro-Train name and others in 1992. |
| 14 | Schwager Nettleton (Schwager-Nettleton Saw Mill, Schwager-Nettleton Mill Co., Schwager & Nettleton Lumber Mills) | Schwager Nettleton Mill, 1913 more images | 1910 | closed 1965 | sawmill & lumber yard | north of Terminal 5; now part of site of Jack Block Park | North edge of Industrial District West. The 1912 Baist map shows this at a location within what the Southwest Harbor Cleanup and Redevelopment Project: Environmental Impact Statement shows as the "Lockheed Property". A 1967 water pollution study attests a Nettleton pier shipping lumber by barge in 1963. |
| 15 | Lockheed Property (Lockheed Shipyard Number 2; 1918: Frank Waterhouse & Co. site before 1959: Puget Sound Bridge and Dredge 1959-1965: Puget Sound Bridge and Drydock Company 1965-1987: Lockheed Shipyard and Construction Company) 1971: Piers G and H) | Remains of piers at Lockheed Property, 2019 | before 1956 | ceased operations 1987 | drydocks, shipyard | north of Terminal 5; now split between Jack Block Park and Terminal 5 Bounded by Elliott Bay (north), West Waterway of the Duwamish (east), Terminal 5 (south), Wyckoff (former Coleman, west) | Operated by Lockheed from 1959 to 1987. A 1967 water pollution study attests two piers and three drydocks in 1963. Its final configuration had five piers: west to east, the first was unnumbered; the others were numbered as Pier 24, 23, 22, and 21, respectively. All piers extended to the north. Just west of pier 21 was a drydock. The western portion of the land had been the West Seattle Landfill, closed in the mid-1960s. There is also an adjacent reference to one "Puget Sound Dredging Co. Pier", which may or may not be part of the same property. After Lockheed left, the land passed to the CEM Development Company, which leased portions to the Purdy Company (who stored scrap metal there) and Salmon Bay Steel (who stored scrap metal and slag). By 1994, the site had been purchased by the Port of Seattle. |
| 16 | Jack Block Park (Terminal 5 Park) | Observation tower, Jack Block Park 2012. more images | 1998 | extant | park with structures including observation tower | north edge of Industrial District West | The park was established after a Superfund cleanup. Known as Terminal 5 Park from its 1998 opening until 2001. |
| 17 | Wilson Shipyard | | by 1918 | after 1918 | shipyard | Industrial District West, north of Ames Shipbuilding and Drydock Co. | A 1918 Port of Seattle map shows this as a distinct shipyard immediately north of Ames. |
| 18 | Ames Shipbuilding & Drydock Company | Ames Shipbuilding Company 1917. Colemans Creosote Plant and Schwager Nettleton are in the middle ground (the last row of buildings). | 1916 | (after 1960) | shipyard and cargo-handling facility | "about 20 acres" in Industrial District West, north of Spokane Street | This was located on part of the site of present-day Terminal 5. It included "a machine shop, blacksmith shop, boiler shop, plate and pattern shops, carpenter and coppersmith shops, and ... a large dining hall and hospital for its employees" and eventually the salmon-packing facility for Libby, McNeil and Libby Company. |
| 19 | Drummond Lighterage Co. | | by 1918 | after 1918 | barge dock | Industrial District West, south of Ames Shipbuilding and Drydock Co. | |
| 20 | Terminal 5 (Seattle Terminal 5) | Terminal 5, 2019 more images | 1964 | extant | container port / marine terminal, mainly on landfill | 86 acres or 172 acres in Industrial District West, north of Spokane Street | Container operations at Terminal 5 began in 1964 and were suspended in July 2014; as of 2019 activities are underway to rework the terminal. A 1967 water pollution study attests a "Banana Terminal" here in 1963 (a year before the official opening of the container port), as well as "Receipt and shipment of general cargo including containerized cargo in foreign and domestic trade; receipt of automobiles and fuel oil; shipment of scrap metal." In 1971: Salmon Terminals, Inc., Sea-Land Service, Inc., United Fruit Co. (Banana Terminal) |
| 21 | Port Commission Iowa Street Ferry Landing | | by 1918 | after 1918 | ferry landing | Industrial District West, southwest corner of West Waterway | A 1918 Port of Seattle map shows this on the west side of the West Waterway, almost exactly at the south end of the part of the West Waterway that runs straight north–south. Below this point the Waterway angles southeast. |
| 22 | Maritime Boat and Engine Works | Maritime Boat and Engine Works, 1920. Elliott Bay Shipbuilding Company circa 1918.: 1917. Probably the West Waterway Lumber Co. in foreground. Fisher Flouring Mill on Harbor Island in background.; Tugs from Island Tug & Barge on this site, seen from Harbor Island, 2023. | (by 1918) | (closed 1936) | shipyard | immediately north of Spokane Street on the West Waterway of the Duwamish, Industrial District West. | Moved to Salmon Bay and renamed as Maritime Shipyards, 1936. Maritime Boat and Engine Works business is not indicated on the 1918 Port of Seattle map; southeast of the Iowa Street Ferry Landing it shows, from northwest to southeast (headed away from Elliott Bay to what is steadily more specifically the Duwamish River): Alaska Pac. Nav. Co. Shipyard; West Waterway Lumber Co.; Elliott Bay Shipbuilding Co.; Erickson Shipbuilding Co.; All from, all spellings theirs. Similarly, but not identically, from the 1918 City of Seattle Harbor Department Map of Central Waterfront District: Alaska-Pacific Shipbuilding Co.; West Waterway Lumber Co.; Index Granite Co.; National Canning Co.; Elliott Bay Yacht & Engine Co.; All from, all spellings theirs. The 1971 harbor map lists West Waterway Lumber Co. here as Pier 7. |

=== Harbor Island ===
Harbor Island is an artificial island in the mouth of the Duwamish River, where it empties into Elliott Bay. Built by the Puget Sound Bridge and Dredging Company, when Harbor Island was completed in 1909 it was the largest artificial island in the world, at 350 acres (1.4 km²). It appears that no substantial businesses had opened on the island in 1911. Since 1912, the island has been used for commercial and industrial activities. Harbor Island was made from 24 million yd³ (18 million m³) of earth removed in the Jackson and Dearborn Street regrades and dredged from the bed of the Duwamish.

This list goes clockwise around Harbor Island, starting from the south end.

| | Name (Alternative names in parentheses) | Image | Year completed | Year destroyed | Type | Location | Notes |
|---|---|---|---|---|---|---|---|
| 1 | Port of Seattle Harbor Island Marina | Harbor Island Marina, 2007 more images | ? | extant | marina, mainly for pleasure boats | Harbor Reach, south end of Harbor Island, especially West Waterway | |
| 2 | Jim Clark Marina | Jim Clark Marina, 2023 | 1973 | extant | marina for pleasure boats | Harbor Island, West Waterway, south of Spokane Street and railroad | |
| 3 | Nieder & Marcus | Abandoned Tilbury Cement towers, 2023 more images | by 1918 | after 1918 | ? | Harbor Island, West Waterway, immediately north of Spokane Street | (Nature of Nieder & Marcus is unknown, and the name wasn't perfectly legible and could be slightly different.) More recently, this site was Tilbury Cement. |
| 4 | Terminal 18 Park | Terminal 18 Park, 2023 more images | ? | extant | public park | Harbor Island at Hanford Street, West Waterway | 1.1 acre public park Near here in 1918 was the Mullins Saw Mill Co. |
| 5 | Campbell Machine Works | | by 1918 | after 1918 | machine works | southwest Harbor Island, West Waterway, small parcel southwest of Mullins Saw Mill Co. | |
| 6 | Fisher Mill (Fisher Flouring Mills Co., Pendleton Mill, Pier 8—Fisher Flouring Mills Co.) | Fisher Flouring Mills Co., circa 1911. more images | 1911 | extant (ruin) | flour mill, grain elevator, pier | southwest Harbor Island, West Waterway | In 1963, the mill was shipping and receiving grain, feed, and flour by barge. Fisher Communications sold the mill to Pendleton in 2001, but Pendleton closed the mill a year later. The mill soon passed into the hands of King County; sound stages for film and video opened there in 2021. |
| 7 | Chas. H. Lilly Co. Flour, Feed | The Lilly flour mill can be partly seen behind the sailboat in this 1913 photo. | between 1911 and 1913 | after 1918 | | immediately north of Fisher Flouring Mills | Charles Lilly was the "Lilly" of Lilly Bogardus |
| 8 | Standard Boiler Works | | by 1918 | after 1918 | boiler works | immediately north of Chas. H. Lilly Co. | |
| 9 | Puget Sound Bridge and Dredging Company Ship yards, (Puget Sound Bridge & Dredging Co. Shipbuilding plant; Lockheed's Yard No. 1; Piers 9 & 10—Lockheed Shipbuilding & Construction Co.) | | between 1911 and 1918 | in ruins as of 2019 | piers | Harbor Island near Seattle Bulk Shipping, West Waterway | A 1967 water pollution study with data for 1963 refers to "Puget Sound Bridge & Drydock Co., Plant No. 1", with four piers, in what appears to be a list going counterclockwise around Harbor Island. The City of Seattle Harbor Department Map of Central Waterfront District, February 1918, shows six piers. 1945 US Navy aerial survey: |
| 10 | Arco (Atlantic Richfield Co.) | Arco, in 2011 | ? | extant | pier | Harbor Island, West Waterway | A 1967 water pollution study with data for 1963 refers to "Richfield Oil Corp. Wharf, Pier 11", in what appears to be a list going counterclockwise around Harbor Island. 1971 harbor map also calls it "Pier 11" but refers to "Atlantic Richfield Co." (reflecting the 1966 merger). |
| 11 | Vigor Shipyard (formerly Todd Drydock & Repairing Co, Todd Shipyard) | Todd Shipyard in 1983 Vigor/Todd Shipyard in 2011 more images | 1918 | extant | shipyard, multiple docks and piers | northwest Harbor Island, West Waterway and north side | Tracing its history back to 1887 via Central Waterfront shipyards Moran Bros. Company, Seattle Construction and Drydock Company, etc., the company was acquired in 1916 by William H. Todd, and moved to Harbor Island in 1918. A 1967 water pollution study with data for 1963 indicates Todd as having seven active piers and four drydocks, as well as owning an unused "Plant A, Pier 18". The 1971 harbor map shows Todd with several multi-vessel piers, Pier 12 on the West Waterway and Piers 13 & 14 on the north side of Harbor Island, as well as sharing Pier 15 with Mobil Oil. Todd built 10 Gleaves-class destroyers concurrently in 1941. In 2011 Todd was acquired by Vigor Industrial. 1945 US Navy aerial survey: |
| 12 | Maxum Petroleum pier | Maxum Petroleum, 2011 | ? | extant | pier | Harbor Island, north side | Maxum may be the same facility that a 1967 water pollution study with data for 1963 lists as "Mobile Oil Co." with two piers, which in turn is certainly the same as Pier 15 that the 1971 harbor map shows as shared by Todd Shipyard and Mobil Oil. At roughly this location, the 1918 Port of Seattle map shows a very small pier labeled "Harbor Island Manufacturing Co.", also shown on that year's City of Seattle Harbor Department Map. Kroll's 1920 map shows the site as "General Petroleum," with no pier. |
| 13 | Pier 16 (1963: Coastal Car Co. Barge Dock; 1971: Alaska Hydro-Train Coastal Co.) | | by 1963 | after 1971 | pier | Harbor Island, north side, where tracks reach shore between 13th Ave SW and 11th Ave SW | As of 2019, there does not appear to be any significant pier protruding from land at this site. |
| 14 | Pier 17 (Puget Sound Tug & Barge, Crowley Marine Services Pier 17; 1971: Alaska Hydro-Train, Puget Sound Tug & Barge, United Transportation Co.) | | by 1963 | extant | pier | Harbor Island, north side, just east of 13th Ave SW | |
| 15 | East Waterway Dock & Warehouse Co. | | between 1911 and 1918 | after 1918 | dock and warehouse | Harbor Island, East Waterway | Now part of Terminal 18. |
| 16 | Terminal 18 (T-18) | Terminal 18 in 2006 (roughly the east/near half of Harbor Island) | by 1971 | extant | container terminal | roughly the east half of Harbor Island | 196 of Harbor Island's 430 acres. 1971 harbor map lists "POS [Port of Seattle] container terminal, Matson Navigation Co., U.S. Navy, United Export Packers". |
| 17 | Pier 19 (Shell Oil Co. Wharf) | Shell facility on Harbor Island, 2011 | by 1963 | after 1971 | pier | Harbor Island, East Waterway | Now part of Terminal 18. Shell still has a large facility roughly in the center of Harbor Island. |
| 18 | Pier 20 (East Water Dock, East Waterway Terminal) | | by 1963 | after 1971 | pier | Harbor Island, East Waterway | 1971 harbor map lists "POS [Port of Seattle] general-cargo terminal, Foreign Trade Zone No. 5, Tank Farm". Now part of Terminal 18. |
| 19 | Rogers, Brown & Co. | | by 1918 | after 1918 | ? | Harbor Island, East Waterway, north of J. F. Duthie & Company | |
| 20 | J. F. Duthie & Company (Duthie & Co. Shipbuilders) | J. F. Duthie & Company, 1917 | 1916 | between 1920 and 1922 | numerous shipyard buildings | Harbor Island, East Waterway | The company predates this particular shipyard, and lasted beyond its closure. It was founded in 1911, and built at least four ships before 1916; in 1928 the company name was changed to Wallace Bridge Company. |
| 21 | Pier 23 (1971: Pioneer Sand and Gravel Co.) | | by 1963 | extant | tugboat/barge wharf | Harbor Island, East Waterway north of Spokane Street | formerly (1963) Pioneer Sand & Gravel Co. Wharf |
| 22 | Harley Marine Services | Harley Marine Services, 2012 | ? | extant | wharf/quay | Harbor Island, East Waterway just north of Spokane Street | |

The 1971 harbor map shows much of Harbor Island south of Spokane Street, along with the area across the East Waterway on the Seattle mainland, as Terminal 102, POS [Port of Seattle] Container Facility.

=== Mudflats south of King Street ===
The mudflats south of King Street were filled in the early 20th century, forming present-day Sodo and the portion of the Industrial District east of the East Waterway of the Duwamish. Prior to that, contained numerous buildings on pilings.

For the post-Fire section, we are confining this to structures east of Commercial Street (later First Avenue South); structures to the west of that correspond more or less to the present-day waterfront. The mudflats south of King Street were filled in at various times starting July 29, 1895 and extending into the late 1910s or, possibly in some cases, the 1920s.

This list runs roughly counterclockwise, first running north up the east shore of the mudflats then turning to include both the north and west shore of the mudflats, as well as a few buildings in the middle of the flats along the early 20th-century rail lines before landfill was complete.

| | Name (Alternative names in parentheses) | Image | Year completed | Year destroyed | Type | Location | Notes |
|---|---|---|---|---|---|---|---|
| 1 | Hemrich & Co's Brewery | This area was not directly affected by the fire. The brewery complex has continuity down to the present time, but the filling of the Industrial District left it far from the bay. Rainier was last brewed there in 1999; the buildings were renovated into offices, apartments, and (since 2011) a small brewery called Emerald City Brewing. See further discussion in the section "Before the Great Fire", above. | | | | | |
| 2 | Palouse Feed Mill Warehouse | See further discussion in the section "Before the Great Fire", above. This area was not directly affected by the fire. | | | | | |
| 3 | Slaughterhouses, including Frye and Bruhn | Frye and Bruhn, meat packers, circa 1905 | c.1888 | ? | slaughterhouses on pilings | West of Grant Street on east shore of Elliott Bay, between Stacy and Plum | This area was not directly affected by the fire. The single slaughterhouse of the late 1880s soon became an entire slaughterhouse district. Filling the Industrial District left this district far from the bay. The 1905 Baist map shows Frye Bruhn & Co. Port Packers west of 9th Avenue, south of Walker St., partly on pilings, with three other unidentified slaughterhouses on pilings between Walker and Plum Street (a block south of Holgate) This is now where Interstate 5 comes through. See further discussion in the section "Before the Great Fire", above. |
| 4 | Seattle Brewing & Malting Co. | | by 1905 | after 1905 | brewery on pilings | foot of Holgate, west of 9th Avenue | This land would be filled soon after 1905 |
| 5 | McDonald & Rice's Planing Mill | See further discussion in the section "Before the Great Fire", above. This area was not directly affected by the fire. | | | | | |
| 6 | (miscellaneous small buildings on pilings) | At lower right, this c. 1898 photo shows small buildings on pilings, the "Old Wharf" at southwest of Washington Iron Works, and part of the ironworks property. | by c. 1898 | between 1905 and 1909 | miscellaneous | west of Seattle Boulevard along the waterfront (roughly Seventh or Eight Avenue) | A 1909 photo shows that these were gone by that date. |
| 7 | Washington Iron Works | At lower right, this c. 1898 photo shows small buildings on pilings, the "Old Wharf" at southwest of Washington Iron Works, and part of the ironworks property. | by 1905 | after 1905 | ironworks on pilings | between Judkins & Plummer, west of Seventh Avenue | At the southwest of this property, the 1905 Baist Map indicates an "Old Wharf" A 1909 photo shows it still clearly on pilings, and minus the old wharf. The 1912 Baist map shows the ironworks still there, minus the wharf, and now spanning Seattle Boulevard; it does not indicate whether it was still mudflat at that time, or filled. |
| 8 | (no known name for the planked area as a whole) | Northern Pacific freight warehouse c. 1891. Apartment buildings over the mud flats, just east of 6th on South Charles Street, 1908. | c. 1889 | c. 1904 | planked area over mudflats | south of King Street, east of Commercial Street | After the fire, the planked area south of King Street was rebuilt and expanded. The Northern Pacific rail facilities shown on the 1893 Sanborn map shows a similar configuration to the C. & P.S. R.R. infrastructure from the 1888 map: a turntable, a roundhouse, car repair and machine shops, warehouses. East of the station between Lane and Weller, also on planks, were some additional structures: the Buchanan and Brooke Company Wagon and Carriage Works east of Fourth Avenue S, the Duwamish Dairy east of Fifth Avenue S, and a few smaller structures. By 1905, this area was taken over by a new configuration of railroads running straight north–south. |
| 9 | Great Northern Freight Depot | Great Northern Freight Depot, circa 1906 | by 1905 | after 1905 | railway freight terminal | south of King Street, east side of Second | |
| 10 | Northern Pacific Freight Depot | | by 1905 | after 1905 | railway freight terminal | south of King Street, east side of Second | |
| 11 | J.W. Fales Paper Co. | | by 1912 | after 1912 | building on pilings | between Norman and Plummer Street, between Fourth and Fifth Ave S. | This was along the Oregon & Washington Railroad tracks that, at that time, ran north–south roughly down the middle of the mudflats south of King Street. |
| 12 | U.S. Steel Products Co. | | by 1912 | after 1912 | building on pilings | Connecticut Street (now S. Royal Brougham Way) and Norman Street, between Fourth and Fifth Ave S. | This was along the Oregon & Washington Railroad tracks. |
| 13 | Vulcan Iron Works | Vulcan Iron Works, 1910 more images | by 1909 | after 1912 | ironworks on piling | between Atlantic Street (now S. Edgar Martinez Drive) and Connecticut Street (now S. Royal Brougham Way) between Fourth and Fifth Ave S. | This was along the Oregon & Washington Railroad tracks. |

=== Waterfront south of Atlantic Street / Edgar Martinez ===
The present-day east shore of Elliott Bay in the Industrial District and Sodo south of South King Street is entirely a product of landfill in the late 19th and early 20th centuries. The list here runs approximately south to north, going north to about historic Atlantic Street (now S. Edgar Martinez Drive), just south of the present-day stadiums.

As of the 2010s, the vast bulk of this area between Spokane Street and S. Edgar Martinez Drive has been combined into a container terminal, Port of Seattle Terminal 30. The only exceptions are:

- a small disused area
- Pier 28
- At the north end of this area, the Coast Guard facility, Pier 36

All from except as noted.

| | Name (Alternative names in parentheses) | Image | Year completed | Year destroyed | Type | Location | Notes |
|---|---|---|---|---|---|---|---|
| 1 | Barton & Co. | | by June 30, 1917 | after 1918 | packing company | under the viaduct/bridge at Spokane Street | Barton & Co., meatpackers, known for "Circle W." meat products |
| 2 | Elliott Bay Mill Co. (Lumber) (unidentified sawmill) | | by 1912 | after 1912 | sawmill | immediately north of Spokane Street, East Waterway | |
| 3 | Puget Sound Bridge and Dredging Company | | by 1912 | between 1912 and 1918 | shipyard, manufacturing facility, etc. | between Spokane and Hanford Streets, south of canal, East Waterway | The company shows at this location on the 1912 Baist map, but the 1918 Port of Seattle map shows it as having moved to Harbor Island. The canal is no longer there (and may never have been, beyond being a cleared spot on the right bank of the Duwamish: David B. Williams raises the possibility that maps from the era may be inaccurate in showing it); this would now be roughly at E. Marginal Way, south of S. Hinds St. By 1940, the company had moved to Harbor Island |
| 4 | Spokane Street Dock (Port Commission, Spokane; Spokane Street Terminal, Port of Seattle Spokane St, Pier after May 1, 1944: Pier 24) | Spokane Street Terminal, 1927 Aerial view, 1960. Spokane Street Dock below, Hanford Street Dock above. | 1917 | after 1971 | cold storage | between Spokane and Hanford Streets, south of turning basin between piers 24 and 25, East Waterway, roughly the former Puget Sound Bridge and Dredging Company location. | Port of Seattle facility. Seven-story concrete cold storage building. In 1963, the terminal was mainly focused in fish and ice, and had piers on its north and west sides, the north being the turning basin. 1971 harbor map shows the turning basin still there, mentions Auto Warehousing, Inc. and Rainier-Port Cold Storage. At some later date, the turning basin was eliminated, and this was combined into Pier 25 as a container facility, the new Pier 25. |
| 5 | Hefferman Dry Dock Company (Hepperman Dry Dock Company [sic]) | | by 1912 | after 1913 | dry dock facility | north side of mouth of canal, south of Hanford Street, East Waterway | |
| 6 | Hanford Street Dock (Hanford Street Terminal, Hanford Street Wharf; Hanford Street Grain Terminal; Port of Seattle Hanford St. Pier; after May 1, 1944: Pier 25) | Grain terminal at Hanford Street; Sears (now Starbucks headquarters) in background, 1917. more images | 1915 | 1971 | grain terminal including hay shed, transit shed | north of turning basin between piers 24 and 25, south of Hanford Street, East Waterway | Port of Seattle facility. In 1963, the terminal was south and west sides, the south being the turning basin, which is still there on the 1971 harbor map. 1971 harbor map indicates Cargill, Inc. at the grain terminal. When the turning basin was eliminated the grain terminal was torn down and this was combined with Pier 25 as a container facility, the new Pier 25. Its function was effectively replaced by the Terminal 86 Grain Facility; they had a slight overlap in operation. |
| 7 | Isaacson Iron Works (after May 1, 1944: Pier 26) | J. F. Duthie & Company shipbuilders at 2917 Whatcom Avenue | between 1912 and 1944 | 1983 | steel mill | East Waterway, south of Milwaukee Road facilities | The 1918 Port of Seattle map shows "Pacific Const'n & Engineering Co." at approximately this location; Similarly, Pacific Coast Const. & Eng. Co. on the City of Seattle Harbor Department Map of Central Waterfront District of that year. Frank Waterhouse & Company's Pacific Ports (1919) gives the address for that as 2917 Whatcom Avenue; Whatcom Avenue was the extension of Railroad Avenue south through the newly filled lands, along the east margin of the Duwamish Waterway. An image of J. F. Duthie & Company shipbuilders in the collection of the University of Washington Libraries, dating from roughly the same era, gives that identical address for that company. Isaacson Iron Works began as a blacksmith shop in 1907. During World War II, Isaacson Steel incorporated the Jorgensen Steel Works. Eventually the largest steel mill in the Pacific Northwest, the Isaacson Forge division was sold to the Earle M. Jorgensen Company in 1965. The Isaacson plant closed in 1983, with all equipment shipped to China. This area was eventually combined with into the new Pier 25 container facility. |
| 8 | Chicago, Milwaukee, St. Paul and Pacific Railroad (Milwaukee Road) facilities (C.M.&S.P., R. R. Ferry Slip (C. M. & St. P. Ry.), C.M.&St.P.R.R. Wharf & Car Ferry, Chicago, Milwaukee, St. Paul and Pacific Railroad Car Ferry Slip, C. M. & St. P. Ry. (Sound & Coast Dock), The Milwaukee Road, Milwaukee Ferry Slip, after May 1, 1944: Pier 27; Milwaukee Ocean Dock, after May 1, 1944: Pier 28.) | Milwaukee Road facilities, 1915 Weiding and Independent Fisheries, 1912 This 1930 photo of Commercial Boiler Works may or may not be the same location. | by 1907 | after 1971 | freight house, sidings | foot of Forrest Street | Freight house on north side of Forrest, yard with sidings on south side, with a small waterway in between. A 1967 water pollution study with data for 1963 shows Pier 27 as "Chicago, Milwaukee, St. Paul and Pacific Railroad Car Ferry Slip"; it refers to the northern pier simply as "Pier 28". A map in a 1973 Seattle government report shows "Milwaukee Road" still having a facility in this area. 1971 harbor map shows American Mail Line at Pier 28. The currently designated Pier 28 may not correspond exactly to the area so designated in 1944. According to Paul Dorpat's 2005 book, the Lander and Stacy Street piers had been incorporated into Pier 28 before the big consolidation of Terminal 30. |
| 9 | until 1913: Weiding and Independent Fisheries (Wieding (sic) Fish Co.; after 1913: National Independent Fisheries Co, although the 1918 City of Seattle Harbor Department Map of Central Waterfront District still shows "Weiding Fish Co.") | Milwaukee Road facilities, 1915 Weiding and Independent Fisheries, 1912 This 1930 photo of Commercial Boiler Works may or may not be the same location. | between 1907 and 1912 | 1922? | fish packing facility? | on pier west of Milwaukee Road freight house | Became National Independent Fisheries in 1913; company liquidated August 2, 1922. |
| 10 | Commercial Boiler Works Wharf | Milwaukee Road facilities, 1915 Weiding and Independent Fisheries, 1912 This 1930 photo of Commercial Boiler Works may or may not be the same location. | by 1912 | after 1915 | pier with structures | immediately north of Milwaukee Road freight house, south of Lander | (Might have been part of the Milwaukee Road facility.) From shore to open water: Western Iron Works; Seattle Machine Works; Commercial Boiler Works; A 1910 listing of piers in 1907 indicates Oregon & Washington Railway in this area; it might have been the same facility. |
| 11 | Lander Street Wharf (South Pier 2;, Lander Street Terminal, Port of Seattle Lander St. Pier & Stacy St. Pier after May 1, 1944: Pier 29); Stacy Street Dock (Stacy Street Terminal after May 1, 1944: Pier 30); and Port of Seattle Grain Terminal. | Lander and Stacy Street docks October 9, 1914......and in 1915. more images | c. 1914 | after 1971 | piers / wharves | between Lander and Stacy Streets (grain terminal extended further), East Waterway | Port of Seattle facilities, used by (among others) the American-Hawaiian Steamship Co., and (as of 1971) Black Ball Freight Service. These were west of the Sears that is now (2019) Starbucks headquarters. Immediately before the piers in this area were all combined as a single container terminal, Terminal 30 served from 2003 to 2009 as a temporary terminal for Alaska cruises by Holland America Line and Princess Cruises, which relocated in 2009 to a permanent facility at Pier 91. |
| 12 | San Juan Fish & Packing Ice Co. (San Juan Fish Co., San Juan Fish & Packing Co., San Juan Fish Dock, San Juan Fishing Pack Co. after May 1, 1944: Pier 31; 1971: Rothschild Int'l Stevedoring Co.) | San Juan Fish Dock, 1913 more images | by 1911 | after 1963; probably after 1971 | fish processing plant on long pier | foot of Stacy Street, and to the north of that, East Waterway | 1971 reference has it as a stevedoring operation, not a fish processing plant, but presumably the same pier. |
| 13 | Nilson & Kelez Shipbuilding Co.) | | by 1918 | after 1918 | shipyard | between San Juan Fish Dock and Standard Oil, East Waterway | The 1912 Baist map shows this as an unnamed planked area with a saw mill and a machine shop |
| 14 | Standard Oil Co. Oil Wharf (Standard Oil, Standard Oil Dock, after May 1, 1944: Pier 32) | Standard Oil facility, 1905 | by c. 1905 | after 1973 | oil wharf and (on shore) complex of oil tanks | between Walker and Holgate, East Waterway | A small, adjacent inland property may have been the world's first gas station (1907). |
| 15 | Hammond Milling (Hammond Mill Co.) | The Hammond Mill was the rightmost of the three waterfront mills in this 1906 photo (Centennial and Albers to its left) | by 1906 | between 1913 and 1944 | flour mill | north of Holgate, East Waterway | Along with Albers and Centennial Mills, part of the "flour milling district". A 1910 listing of piers in 1907 mentions Hammond, but lists them farther south, between Standard Oil and San Juan Fish Company; they may have had an earlier facility there. |
| 16 | Telephone Pole Yard, Pacific Northwest Bell Telephone (after May 1, 1944: Pier 33;) | | by 1944 | after 1971 | telephone pole yard | south of Associated Oil Dock | A 1967 water pollution study with data for 1963 does not mention this facility, so it may have been gone by then. Paul Dorpat's 2005 book specifically says it has "disappeared". |
| 17 | Associated Oil Dock, Phillips Petroleum Co. (after May 1, 1944: Pier 34; in 1963: Tidewater Oil Company) | | by 1944 | after 1971 | oil dock | south of Albers Bros. Milling Co. | |
| 18 | Oregon Boiler | | by 1912 | after 1912 | manufacturing facility | south of Albers Bros. Milling Co. | The 1912 Baist map shows this on the shore (possibly on land, possibly on planking) south of Albers Bros. |
| 19 | Albers Bros. Milling Co. (before May 1, 1944: Albers Bros. Milling Co. Dock (after May 1, 1944: Pier 35) | Loading up at Albers Mill in 1906. | by 1906 | after 1944; disused by 1963 | flour mill | south of Massachusetts Street, East Waterway | Along with Hammond and Centennial Mills, part of the "flour milling district". Inland of the mill in 1912 were a hay and grain warehouse and "Plaster Co. Furniture Fact[ory] 3". |
| 20 | Jack Perry Memorial Shoreline Public Access (Jack Perry Memorial Park) | Old pier, probably a remnant of the Albers Dock, 2007. more images | ? | extant | shoreline access park | 1700 East Marginal Way S., south of Massachusetts Street, East Waterway | near the historic site of Albers Milling |
| 21 | City of Seattle Fire Wharf (Fireboat Snoqualmie) | | by 1918 | after 1918 | fire wharf | between Albers Mill and Skinner & Eddy, East Waterway | |
| 22 | before 1917: Seattle Dock Company's Re-plat 1917-1920: Skinner & Eddy's shipbuilding plant No. 2 | Fire at Golden West Baking Co., Seattle, September 24, 1909 Skinner and Eddy shipyard, 1917 | by 1912 | closed 1920 | shipyard and various other structures | north of Massachusetts Street, East Waterway, extending slightly north of the foot of S. Edgar Martinez Drive (formerly Atlantic Street); at times, this included about 10 acres north of Atlantic Street. | The 1912 Baist map shows a variety of buildings, including Golden Baking Co. (sic: actually Golden West Baking Co.), NW Dairy Co. an unnamed meatpacking company, Hofius Steel Equipment, and Letson & Burpee, besides Seattle Dock Company's own shipyard. Interstate Fisheries Co. at this location (originally "Inter-State Fisheries") went public in 1902, and in 1913 had 190 feet (58 m) of dock frontage, and in 1907, prior to their opening of a large facility north of Broad Street, Union Oil Company of California had a facility here; the facility is still shown on a 1911 map. Beginning in April 1917, during World War I, the Skinner & Eddy Corporation first leased and (in June 1918) purchased all of this property, as well as further property to the north that was owned by Centennial Mill. However, by 1920, the war's end and economic depression resulted in an end to Skinner & Eddy shipbuilding operations. The property passed to the United States Shipping Board and, in 1923, was sold to the Port of Seattle, who, in turn, sold it to the Pacific Coast Steamship Company, which soon thereafter merged into the Pacific-Alaska Navigation Company, which then changed its name to the Pacific Steamship Company. |
| 23 | 1925-1940: Pacific Steamship Company 1940-1958 or 1960: U.S. Army Seattle Port of Embarkation (before May 1, 1944: Piers A, B, C, D; after May 1, 1944: Piers 36, 37, 38, 39; also, in September 1955 the port of embarkation was renamed Seattle Army Terminal) since 1966: United States Coast Guard Station Seattle (Pier 36, U. S. Coast Guard Integrated Support Command Seattle, U. S. Coast Guard Base Seattle) | Pier 39, 1946 Coast Guard base, 2007 Seen from Alaskan Way, 2011. Museum in foreground. more images | 1925 | extant | 1925-1940: steamship dock 1940-1958 or 1960: U.S. Army Port of Embarkation 1958 or 1960-1965: Army Corps of Engineers District Headquarters since 1966: USCG facility | north of Massachusetts Street, East Waterway, extending slightly north of the foot of S. Edgar Martinez Drive (formerly Atlantic Street); at times, this included about 10 acres north of Atlantic Street. | This is the same location as the Seattle Dock Company's Re-plat and Skinner & Eddy's shipbuilding plant No. 2. Pacific Steamship's building (BLDG 1) was "a very modern passenger and freight terminal" when it was built in 1925, and remains the hub of this facility nearly a century later. At least part of the Pacific Steamship facility was abandoned and became part of a Hooverville in the late 1930s, before being repurposed as a Port of Embarkation. The Hooverville was bulldozed April 10, 1941. Since 1965, the piers have belonged to the Port of Seattle, who lease it to the Coast Guard. It is the only substantial military facility left in King County. Includes Coast Guard Museum Northwest. 1971 harbor map lists Pier 36 as "POS [Port of Seattle] general-cargo terminal". Pier 37, built 1941 for the Port of Seattle as a general cargo terminal was taken over in 1960 by the U.S. Army Corps of Engineers as its District Headquarters The Port of Seattle reacquired Pier 37 in 1965, but it continued to function as the Corps of Engineers District HQ at least until 1971. By 1971, Pier 38 was gone, and Pier 39 was listed as a "POS [Port of Seattle] OCP terminal". |

=== Waterfront from Atlantic Street to King Street ===
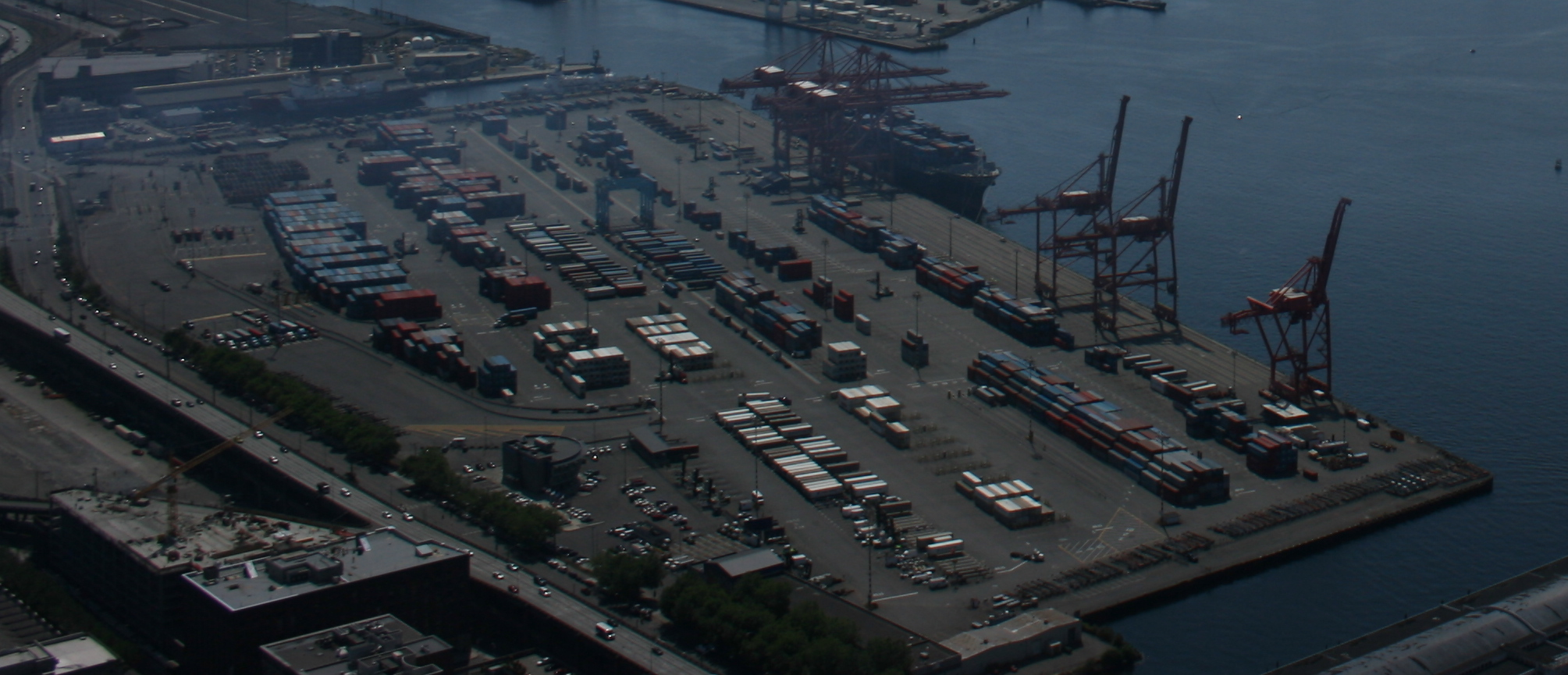
Terminal 46, 2009, seen from the Columbia Center.

The former S. Atlantic Street is now known as S. Edgar Martinez Drive. From here north, the waterfront faces the open water of Elliott Bay, rather than the channelized Duwamish River. Beginning in the early 1980s, the waterfront area roughly between S. Edgar Martinez Drive and King Street were combined into a 3-berth container terminal, Port of Seattle Terminal 46. All of the waterways between the piers were filled in. As late as 1971, the Port of Seattle still distinguished Piers 42 and 43, and when the current three-berth configuration was first implemented, the southernmost berth was still known for a time as Pier 37 (see prior section), the other two both as Pier 46.

| | Name (Alternative names in parentheses) | Image | Year completed | Year destroyed | Type | Location | Notes |
|---|---|---|---|---|---|---|---|
| 1 | Centennial Mill | Centennial Mill, 1900 more images | 1898 | 1917 | flour mill | north of Atlantic (now Edgar Martinez) | Along with Hammond and Albers Mills, part of the "flour milling district". In 1912, the Centennial Mill pier was also home to United Collieries Co. and Hammond Warehouse Co., with a furniture warehouse and an iron forge. Torn down in 1917 for the northern part of Skinner & Eddy Plant No. 2. There were extensive structures on the pier besides the mill itself. In the 1903 view to the east shown here, only the iron works barely discernible in the background at top is on the far (east) side of Railroad Avenue. |
| 2 | Northern Fish Co. | Northern Fish Co. pier seen from atop Centennial Mill, 1903 | by 1905 | after 1912 | feed & fuel company, engine works, lumber yard. | south of Connecticut (now Royal Brougham) | 1903 photo shows signs for Northern Fish Co. and United Parking Co. |
| 3 | C.&P.S. Log Spur | | by 1918 | after 1918 | railway spur | at Connecticut (now Royal Brougham)- | "C.&P.S." is presumably Columbia and Puget Sound Railroad. That name had actually gone out of use in 1916, when that became the Pacific Coast Railroad Company. |
| 4 | Black's Replat | | by 1912 | after 1912 | pier with a variety of small businesses | north of Connecticut (now Royal Brougham) | Buildings on the pier included (roughly from dry land to open water) "N.W. Iron Works, Alaska Boiler Shop, American Iron & Wire Wks, Elevators & Hoisting Machinery, Boiler Wks." The 1918 City of Seattle Harbor Department Map of Central Waterfront District labels this area as "Steel Yard." |
| 5 | Port of Seattle (Central Terminal; Alaska Steamship Company Terminal;) after May 1, 1944: Pier 42) | | by 1944 | after 1971 | steamship pier | | Also used as part of the port of embarkation during World War II. The Alaska Steamship Company moved here in the late 1940s. |
| 6 | (various structures on planking) | | 1889 | by 1912 | various structures | south of Norman Street | The 1893 Sanborn map shows an area equivalent to five city blocks west of Commercial St (First Ave S) running east–west, south of Norman Street, as a series of planked areas over tide flats. The block from Commercial St to West Street is mainly tenements. The narrow strip between West Street and the Railroad Avenue tracks shows a small boatbuilder facing south onto the tideflats. Buildings in the next block west include the Cha's K. Zorn Furniture Factory and the McSorley Bottling Works. Then a block-long pier leads to Mechanics Mill and Lumber Co's saw mill. A 1910 listing of piers in 1907 lists a "city wharf" in this area. |
| 7 | The Moran Co. Ship Builders (Seattle Construction and Drydock Company, Seattle Drydock and Shipbuilding Co., Moran Bro's Co.) | Moran Bros. Shipyard, 1902 Moran Bros. between 1903 and 1909, with Dearborn Coal Wharf and Centennial Mill in background. more images | 1889 | 1918 | shipyard | north of Black's Replat, extending north roughly to the foot of Charles Street. | The Moran Brothers began rebuilding at this site on the tideflats immediately after the Great Seattle Fire, opening for business just ten days later. The company expanded steadily, covering 15 acres (6.1 ha) by 1892, and building 14 paddlewheelers for the Yukon Gold Rush trade between January and May 1898 and going on to build the USS Nebraska (BB-14). The 1893 Sanborn map shows the shipyard running mainly east–west in a single north–south block south of Charles Street. The area equivalent to five city blocks west of Commercial St (First Ave S) is a series of planked areas over tide flats. At the northwest corner of Commercial and Plummer is a dairy. At the northwest corner of the same "block" (most of which is unplanked tide flat), the southeast corner of Charles and West Streets, is P.V. Dwyer Bros. Foundry. Just west of West Street are the railroad tracks of Railroad Avenue, then, successively, Moran Bros. Co. (mainly a foundry) and Seattle Drydock and Shipbuilding Co., and a "deep water wharf." In the block west of West Street a "flask yard" extends a block south of Plummer Street. ("Flasks" are the frames used for casting metal in a foundry.) During World War I, from about 1916, this was an additional Skinner & Eddy facility. |
| 8 | (unnamed pier between Charles and Dearborn) | | by 1893 | shortly before 1912 | multiple buildings | about halfway between Charles and Dearborn | This street-like unnamed pier ran west from Commercial St (now First Avenue South) and gave access to numerous buildings on its south side, built on planking: Puget Sound Steam Laundry, at the southwest corner of Commercial; a building vacant as of 1893 at the southwest corner of Railroad Avenue; San Francisco Bridge Co. storehouse, about another 0.05 miles (0.080 km) west; Then, at a distance of about 0.1 miles (0.16 km) west, the Allen & Nelson Land Co. storehouse, just southwest of Myers Meat Packing Co. on the next pier north.; A 1910 list of piers in 1907 refers to this pier at "Puget Sound Dredging Company (or San Francisco Bridge Company)," and a 1911 map as "S.F. Bridge Co." |
| 9 | (unnamed pier including Myers Packing Co.) | Myers Packing Co., 1895 | by 1893 | c. 1903 | long wharf including fish packing company | foot of Weller, narrow wharf to west, then angling southwest | The wharf was contiguous with Stetson & Post. Just north of Weller Street was an east–west tramway, and north of that a block west of Railroad Avenue was Rock Plaster Co.'s Mill. West of that, a pier angled southwest and widened to accommodate the Myers Packing Co., and continued to the southwest. |
| 10 | Wellington Coal Co. | | by 1918 | after 1918 | coaling pier | north of Seattle Construction and Drydock Company | |
| 11 | Gen. Petroleum Co. | | by 1918 | after 1918 | tank facility? | north of Wellington Coal Co. | Map suggests some sort of tank, south of the west end of the C.&P.S.R.R. Spur following. |
| 12 | C.&P.S.R.R. Spur | | by 1918 | after 1918 | railway spur | north of Wellington Coal Co. and Gen. Petroleum Co. | "C.&P.S.R.R." is presumably "Columbia and Puget Sound Railroad". That name had actually gone out of use in 1916, when that became the Pacific Coast Railroad Company. |
| 13 | Seattle Coal & Fuel Co. (P. C. Coal Docks (2) and Bunkers; Pacific Coast Coal Pier; Pacific Coast Coalbunkers; Pacific Coast Coal Co. after May 1, 1944: Pier 43) | Wagons at Seattle Coal & Fuel Co.'s Dearborn Coal Wharf, c. 1909 US Army Transport Dix coaling up at the foot of Dearborn, 1912 more images | c. 1903 | at least late 1950s | coaling pier | foot of Dearborn | Coaling pier was moved south from King Street c. 1903 when the main line railroads finally reached Seattle from the south. A 1967 water pollution study with data for 1963 breaks this into "North Pier 43: Mooring company-owned tugs and barges" and "South Pier 43: Shipment of drilling mud (barite); mill scale, ammonium sulphate (fertilizer material); magnesite, and coal. It is not clear whether the 1963 structure is the same structure as in the first half of the 20th century. Paul Dorpat says this was combined into Pier 46 in the late 1950s, but the 1971 harbor map shows a distinct Pier 43, described as "James Griffiths & Sons, Inc.[;] Washington Tug & Barge Co.". The part of Dearborn Street nearest the waterfront is a bit north of the line of the rest of Dearborn, probably closer to Lane. |
| 14 | Pioneer Sand & Gravel Co. | | by 1918 | after 1918 | | just north of Pacific Coast Coal Co., looks contiguous with it. | |
| 15 | Oregon, Washington Railway and Navigation Co. | | by 1911 | c. 1930s | | presumably between Dearborn St. and Elliott Bay Dry Dock Co. | This may or may not be the same pier that the 1918 City of Seattle Harbor Department Map of Central Waterfront District labels "U.W.K.&N.Co." and shows in this location. |
| 16 | Elliott Bay Dry Dock Co. | | by 1913 | c. 1930s | | | |
| 17 | Union Pacific Railroad Terminal (Union Pacific Dock; after May 1, 1944: Pier 44) | | c. 1930s | after 1944. probably late 1950s | | | Combined the Oregon, Washington Railway and Navigation Co. Elliott Bay Dry Dock Co. piers. Used by Matson in the 1930s. Paul Dorpat says this was combined into Pier 46 in the late 1950s, but that date is probably too early. |
| 18 | Stetson & Post Co.; Stetson-Post | Stetson & Post, 1900 more images | 1889 | between 1909 and 1912 | sawmill and related buildings | between foot of Lane and foot of King | There was a long pier in the southern half, between Lane and Weller. |
| 19 | (piers between Dearborn & King Streets) | | by 1912 | after 1918 | piers | between Dearborn and King | The 1912 Baist map shows a largely empty planked area roughly between Dearborn & King Streets, with at least two distinct piers, corresponding to the Stetson & Post location from the 1893 Sanborn map. The more northerly, at the foot of King Street, is labeled "Sand Wharf" and shows a machine shop just west of Railroad Avenue. (The line of Dearborn in 1912 is close to the line of Lane in 1893.) The 1918 Port of Seattle map describes the pier at the foot of King Street as "Boiler Works, Machine Shops & c." |
| 20 | King Street Coal Wharf (Oregon Improvement Co.'s Coal Bunker) | King Street Coal Wharf in 1902 more images | 1889 | c.1903 | coal wharf | foot of King Street | Two long piers at a roughly 20° angle to one another. Coaling pier was moved south to Dearborn Street c. 1903 when the main line railroads finally reached Seattle from the south. |
| 21 | King Street Dock (King Street Pier, Trimble's wharf, Trimble Dock; Chesley Dock; after May 1, 1944: Pier 45) | King Street Dock, 1917 | by 1907 | after 1944, probably late 1950s, almost certainly before 1963 | pier | foot of King | A 1910 document listing piers in 1907 refers to "King street wharf and Chesley tug dock, leased by Chesley Towboat Company of the Pacific Coast Company, and partly sublet to shops and boats." A 1913 listing in Railway & Marine News refers to "Chesley Dock" with 635 feet (194 m) of dock frontage; Chesley was a tugboat company. From at least 1917 to 1929, the pier was owned by William Pitt Trimble, whose wife died there in an accident in December 1929. Paul Dorpat says this was combined into Pier 46 in the late 1950s, but that date is probably too early. |

=== Central Waterfront: King Street to Broad Street ===
| | Name (Alternative names in parentheses) | Image | Year completed | Year destroyed | Type | Location | Notes |
|---|---|---|---|---|---|---|---|
| 1 | in 1912, 1918: Pier D, Pacific Steamship Co. (in 1913: Pier D (P. C. S. S. Co.) before May 1, 1944: Luckenback Steamship Company, Pier D after May 1, 1944: Pier 46) | Pier 46 (at left), 1953 more images | c. 1907 | after 1953 | steamship pier | | The 1912 Baist map shows this serving the California Line. File:View from Alaskan Way Viaduct, 1953 (39737727923).jpg clearly shows "Luckenback", although some sources refer to "Luchenbach", for which see the photo of Pier 1/Pier 50 below. |
| 2 | Wayside Mission Hospital | The Idaho functioning as Wayside Mission Hospital at Pier C more images | by 1900 | after 1910 | pier and warehouse | foot of Jackson Street | The sidewheel steamboat Idaho was berthed here from 1900 to at least 1909, and served from 1900 to 1907 as the "Wayside Mission Hospital". Sources refer to it as "on pilings alongside the Pacific Coast Steamship Co.'s, Pier C," but judging by this photo of its opening it actually predates the pier. |
| 3 | Oregon Improvement Company Pier B ("B" Oregon Improvement Warehouse); Lilly & Bogardus | Oregon Improvement Co. Pier "A" at center, Pier "B" at right, c. 1892. Lilly Bogardus seed company at Pier B, 1900. King Street coaling pier in background at right. more images | by 1893 | before 1903 | pier and warehouse | between Jackson and Main Streets | The 1893 Sanborn map shows "A" and "B" Oregon Improvement Warehouse piers; the configuration shows waiting rooms, baggage rooms, a lunchroom, etc., indicative of passenger traffic. Between the piers, that map shows a small "S.L.&R. Reading Room" (presumably Stevedores, Longshoremen and Riggers' Union) on a tiny pier at the exact foot of Main Street. The 2006 Central Waterfront Context Statement prepared for the Department of Neighborhoods by Thomas Street History Services asserts that the 1893 piers "A" and "B" are distinct from the later piers with the same designations: "South of the central waterfront and Yesler Way, the Ocean Dock, located roughly between Main and Washington Streets, consisted of two piers, Pier A and Pier B (later Pier 48), adjoined to the south by Pier C, known as the City Dock. Previously Pier A had been located between Main and Washington Streets and Pier B between Jackson and Main Streets." |
| 4 | Oregon Improvement Company Pier A ("A" Oregon Improvement Warehouse) | Oregon Improvement Co. Pier "A" at center, Pier "B" at right, c. 1892. Lilly Bogardus seed company at Pier B, 1900. King Street coaling pier in background at right. more images | by 1893 | before 1903 | pier and warehouse | between Main and Washington Streets | |
| 5 | in 1912, 1918: Pier C, Pacific Steamship Co. (City Dock, Lilly's Dock; Lilly-Bogardus Dock before May 1, 1944: Pacific Coast Company, Pier C after May 1, 1944: Pier 47) | The Pacific Coast Company piers, 1916 more images | by 1903 | c. 1970 | pier | south of Pier B | The 1918 City of Seattle Harbor Department Map of Central Waterfront District adds a note for Pier C that is not perfectly legible but seems to read "Tyres Storage and Distributing Co." The Oregon Improvement Company went bankrupt in 1895 and was succeeded by the Pacific Coast Company; both were owners of the Columbia & Puget Sound Railroad. Piers A, B, and C (completely distinct from the earlier Piers A and B) were all adjoined to one another. Paul Dorpat indicates that "Pacific Coast Terminals Piers C and A were shortened [before 1944]" and that "some place in the [c. 1970] remodeling of Pier 48 the over-the-water parts [of both] were demolished and the land portions behind the bulkheads were incorporated into Pier 48" (The 1971 harbor map shows these all as Pier 48.) McCormick Steamship Co used Pier 48 in the late 1930s and after World War II. Around 1970 Pier 48 was remodeled; the north side became a ferry slip for the Alaska Marine Highway System, and was used until they moved to Bellingham, Washington in 1989. They also used the south side of the Pier 48 and the north side of Pier 46 to moor and overhaul their ferries. The pier was the site of one of Nirvana's most famous performances on December 13, 1993. The pier shed was demolished in 2010. |
| 6 | in 1912, 1918: Pier B, Pacific Steamship Co. (with Pier A, Ocean Dock; in 1913: Pier B (CP Railway Docks) before May 1, 1944: McCormick Steamship Company, Pier B; after May 1, 1944: Pier 48) | Pier 48, 2010, shortly before shed was demolished more images | 1889 | extant, without shed | steamship pier | foot of Main Street | |
| 7 | in 1911: Columbia & Puget Sound Railroad Pier A (with Pier B, Ocean Dock; in 1912-1913: Pier A, Pacific Coast Steamship Co., C.P. Line to Vancouver; in 1918: Pier A, Pacific Steamship Co.; Pacific Coast Company, Pier A, after May 1, 1944: Pier 49) | more images | | c. 1970 | steamship pier | North of Pier B, extending roughly to Washington Street | |
| 8 | Washington Street Public Boat Landing and Harbor Entrance Pergola (in 1918: Wash. Gridiron City of Seattle) | Harbor Entrance Pergola, 2007 more images | "scow gridiron" by 1893; pergola: 1920 | extant | public boat landing (now closed) and pergola | foot of Washington Street | The 1893 Sanborn map shows an incline at the foot of Washington Street with a "scow gridiron" flanked by two small wharves; a similar description is given in 1910 referring to "freight scows"; the 1918 Port of Seattle map refers to "City of Seattle, Wharf & Gridiron". Presumably this is also the "City Slip" at the foot of Washington referred to in the 1899 Polk's Directory. |
| 9 | Hatfield's Wharf and Warehouses | | by 1893 | after 1893 | wharf and warehouses | Just north of Washington Street | File:Yesler Way at Railroad Avenue map, Seattle, 1896 (MOHAI 13411).jpg implies that there was also a post-fire Harrington and Smith Wharf contiguous with Hatfield's Wharf and immediately to its south. |
| 10 | Yesler['s] Wharf | | 1889 | 1901 | wharf | foot of Yesler Way | Except for some pilings that survived the Great Seattle Fire, this was a completely distinct structure from the pre-fire wharf of the same name in the same location. Work on rebuilding the wharf began within days after the fire, while some of the city was "still smouldering." The 1893 Sanborn map shows the wharf as containing a lumber yard and various woodwork-related businesses, as well as a depot, baggage room, and warehouses related to maritime commerce. |
| 11 | In 1912, 1918: Pier 1, Northern Pacific Railway (in 1913: Pier 1, N. P. Ry. Docks—C. P. R. Coast Service; in 1918: Harbor Dep't City of Seattle, Pier 1, N.P.Ry Co., C.P.Ry S.S. Co. 1918 and before May 1, 1944: Alaska Steamship Company, Pier 1; after May 1, 1944: Pier 50) | Alaska Steamship Company, Pier 1, circa 1915 A 1920s photo shows this as the Luckenbach Line more images | between 1901 and 1904 | early 1980s | pier | | Paul Dorpat says that this pier (which, along with Pier 2/51, replaced Yesler's Wharf) was first used by Luckenback/Luckenbach Steamship Co. (he gives both spellings) for their intercoastal service, then by Alaska Steamship Company (no start date given but they were apparently there in the World War II era). Alaska Steam Ship Company was there as early as the first decade of the 20th century, when they shared the pier with the Port Angeles-Victoria Line and the Vancouver Line. In 1917, Pier 1 was owned by the Northern Pacific Railway, and operated by the Canadian Pacific Steamship Company, the Pacific-Alaska Navigation Company, and the Port Angeles Transportation Company and was also the headquarters of the port warden. In the late 1940s, Alaska Steamship Co. moved to Pier 42 and Nippon Yusen Kaisha used this pier until September 17, 1960 as port of call for the Hikawa Maru, the only Japanese passenger ship to survive the WWII. In 1971, it was owned and/or operated by Seattle Piers, Inc. and, along with Pier 51, was the proposed site for a World Trade Center. Torn down early 1980s to expand the Washington State Ferries terminal at Pier 52 (Colman Dock). |
| 12 | in 1912, 1918: Pier 2, Northern Pacific Railway (1912 & before May 1, 1944: Alaska Steamship Company, Pier 2 after May 1, 1944: Pier 51) | Alaska Steamship Company, Pier 2, circa 1911 more images | between 1901 and 1904 | early 1980s | pier | | In its early years this was port of call for the Whatcom Line, Joshua Green's LaConner T. & T Company line and the Port Orchard Line. As with Pier 50, Alaska Steamship Company left in the late 1940s. The pier had various uses over the next three decades. Washington State Ferries moored ships there; eventually the pier lost its shed and became mainly a parking lot. In the early 1960s, the restaurant Polynesia was built there. The pier was also home to Ye Olde Curiosity Shop. In 1971, it was owned and/or operated by Seattle Piers, Inc. and, along with Pier 50, was the proposed site for a World Trade Center. Torn down early 1980s to expand the Washington State Ferries terminal at Pier 52 (Colman Dock). |
| 13 | Budlong's Boathouse | | by 1893 | after 1893 | boat house on float | foot of Columbia Street | Another structure that was recreated after the fire; distinct from the pre-fire boathouse |
| 14 | Coleman's (sic) Boathouse | | by 1893 | after 1893 | boat house on float | foot of Columbia Street extending out from Budlong's Boathouse | |
| 15 | in 1913: Colman Dock (Inland Navigation Co.) (in 1918: Colman Dock, Colman Wharf; before May 1, 1944: Colman Dock (Puget Sound Navigation Company) (Puget Sound Navigation Company); after May 1, 1944: Pier 52; WSF Colman Dock; Seattle Terminal) | Colman Dock, 1917 more images | by 1903 | after 1944 | Mosquito Fleet/ferry pier | foot of Columbia Street | James Colman's Colman Dock was rebuilt many times. In 1903, it had two sheds, each with a pitched roof, and a box-like office/storefront along Railroad Avenue similar to Pier 6/ 57. In 1905 it included a ship's chandler and a fish shop; in 1906, Frank H. Folsom, based there, advertised himself as an electrical contractor also selling telegraph poles, piles, spars and lumber. In 1908, Colman extended the pier west to a length of 705 feet (215 m), added a domed waiting room, and a clock tower on the water end of the pier. Much of the Puget Sound Mosquito Fleet docked there. In May 1912 the steamer Alameda crashed into Colman Dock, knocked over the clock tower, and plowed into the waiting room. Two piers north, the Flyer Dock was destroyed. A gangplank was set up at Colman Dock as a temporary loading area, but only weeks later it failed under the weight of a crowd of passengers; two people died and 58 more were injured. In 1938, the Puget Sound Navigation Company, known as the Black Ball Line, rebuilt Colman Dock in Art Deco style, matching the streamlined MV Kalakala ferry they had introduced three years prior. Washington State Ferries bought them out in 1951 and rebuilt the pier in 1966. According to Paul Dorpat, the name "Colman Dock" went out of use with the 1944 rename as Pier 52, but came back with the early 1980s expansion. |
| 16 | Coleman (sic) Dock Warehouse (Colman-Hatfield Wharf) | | 1889 | after 1893 | "hay, grain, and feed" building, warehouse, and waiting room | just south of foot of Marion Street | Adjoined West Seattle Ferry Dock. |
| 17 | West Seattle Ferry Dock (West Seattle Ferry slip, Port Commission, Marion Street Ferry Landing; W.S. Ferry, Port of Seattle; West Seattle Ferry) | | by 1893 | after 1893 | ferry dock, including waiting room | foot of Marion Street | In 1893, adjoined Coleman Dock Warehouse to the south G. G. Willey Cement Lime and Plaster to the north. From some later date in the 1890s until 1912, adjoined the Flyer Dock to the north. |
| 18 | G. G. Willey Cement, Lime and Plaster; Commercial Dock | | by 1893 | after 1893, probably after 1899 | warehouse | just north of foot of Marion Street | Adjoined West Seattle Ferry Dock. The 1893 Sanborn map shows three separate large structures here. From south to north: G. G. Willey Cement, Lime and Plaster Warehouse; Commercial Dock Warehouse and office; building includes Hutton and Son Machine Shop, Sprague Autom[obile] Motor, G[reat] N[orthern] Freight Off[ice], and two waiting rooms.; Hay storage; cement & lime; All from |
| 19 | Grand Trunk Pacific Dock or Wharf (in 1918: Pacific S.S.Co. Alaska Dock; after May 1, 1944: Pier 53; Canadian National Dock) | Grand Trunk Pacific Dock, 1911. Colman Dock at right. more images | 1910 | 1964 | steamship dock | between Marion and Madison Streets | Like the 1910 Colman Dock (the 1908 to 1912 version), the 1910 Grand Trunk Paciflc Dock had a distinctive tower. That dock had a major fire July 30, 1914. It was rebuilt and survived until 1964, when it was torn down for an expansion of the WSF Colman Dock. Paul Dorpat says that besides Grand Trunk Pacific steamships it was port of call for the "Alaska Pacific Navigation Co" (presumably Alaska Pacific Steamship Company or its successor Pacific-Alaska Navigation Company) and Pacific Steamship Company (successor to the Pacific-Alaska Navigation Company) and various Puget Sound Mosquito Fleet boats Puget Sound Freight Lines, and finally the Black Ball Line (Puget Sound Navigation Company). Part of its moorage space was also, at times, used by the Seattle Fire Department as part of Fire Station No. 5. It was demolished in 1964, for one of the many expansions of Pier 52/Colman Dock. |
| 20 | Flyer Dock | | between 1893 and 1899 | 1912 | dock | foot of Madison Street | Fast steamboat service to Tacoma. A 1910 listing of piers in 1907 refers to, "Flyer Dock, Columbia River and Puget Sound Navigation Company (leased of K. McIntosh)." |
| 21 | Fire Station No. 5 (City fireboat dock, City Dock, Fireboat & Hose House, City Fire Slip, City of Seattle, Fire Wharf, City Landing, Fire Boat Duwamish) | Fire Station No. 5, c. 1910 The current Fire Station No. 5, 2016 more images | by 1893 | extant | fire station | foot of Madison | There have been at least four successive fire stations at this location, all known as "Fire Station No. 5," although the 1893 Sanborn map shows the station, but does not identify its station number.) The second station was completed in early 1903, serving also as a lookout for the harbor master. It was replaced by a two-story Tudor Revival building in 1917. The current station opened December 1963. |
| 22 | (coal bunker); Seattle Coal & Iron Co's Dock and Coal Bunkers | | by 1893 | after 1899 | coal bunker | just north of foot of Madison | |
| 23 | Galbraith-Bacon Dock (Pier 3, Galbraith Dock or Wharf; Pier 3, N.P. Ry. Galbraith Dock; before May 1, 1944: Arlington Dock, Pier 3 after May 1, 1944: Pier 54) | A ship at Pier 3 in the Galbraith era Pier 54, 2016 more images | 1900 | extant | pier | between Madison and Spring Streets | The second Pier built by Northern Pacific Railroad, after the White Star Dock. Original tenants Galbraith and Bacon stored and sold grain, hay, and building materials. John Galbraith's son Walter also used the pier as port of call for his Kitsap Transportation Company. From 1929 to 1935, Gorst Air Transport provided "air ferry" service from this pier to Bremerton, using amphibious Keystone-Loening airplanes. Ivar Haglund opened a short-lived aquarium on this pier in 1938, as well as a fish-and-chips stand; in 1946 he expanded to his restaurant Ivar's Acres of Clams; he bought the pier from Washington Fish and Oyster Company in 1966, though the 1971 harbor map shows that latter company as still located there. The pier was renovated in 1983-1984, and the fish-and-chips stand and restaurant are still there as of 2019. From some time in the 1950s to the early 1970s, part of this pier was the Washington Fish and Oyster Co. fish processing/freezing plant. Currently it is home to Ivar's and several other businesses, including Ye Olde Curiosity Shop, founded 1899 and successively located several different places on and near the Downtown Seattle waterfront. A remark on a photo from MOHAI indicates that the late 1890s Northern Pacific Railroad Pier 1, serving the Canadian Pacific Steamship Co., was approximately at this site. |
| 24 | Towles and Peters Boat House | | by 1893 | after 1893 | boathouse | just south of Spring Street | |
| 25 | Harbor Master's dock | | by 1893 | after 1893 | harbor master's dock | foot of Spring Street | |
| 26 | White Star Dock | White Star Dock c. 1900 more images | 1900 | 1901 | steamship dock, offices, storage | foot of Spring Street | The White Star Dock was built by the Northern Pacific in 1900, but collapsed September 14, 1901 possibly due to being anchored in poor fill. The collapse was slow, and no one was injured. At the time of the collapse, tenants included Zerwekh and Caufman (who stored hay there), and the offices of the Frank A. Bell Co. |
| 27 | Arlington Dock Company (Pier 4; in 1913: Spokane Grain Co.'s Dock; in 1918: Pier 4, N.P.Ry, Spokane Grain Co. & Arlington Dock Co.; before May 1, 1944: Fisherman Supply Company, Pier 4 (Fisherman Supply Company still present in 1971). after May 1, 1944: Pier 55) | Pier 4, 1912 Pier 55, 2009 more images | 1902 | extant | short pier with shops | between Spring and Seneca Streets | Built by Northern Pacific as a replacement for the White Star Dock, on the same site. In its early years, it was a major point of departure for Alaska. Along with the adjacent Pier 5/56, in the 1920s it served as port of call for the Royal Mail Steam Packet Company, the East Asiatic Company and the Cosmos Line. In 1938 it became home to the Fisheries Supply Company, and ceased to be actively involved in shipping; Fisheries Supply remained there until the 1980s. The pier was remodeled in 1945, and again in the 1960s and the 1990s. |
| 28 | Merchants Dock Warehouse | | by 1893 | after 1893 | dock, warehouse | just south of Seneca Street | |
| 29 | first Ainsworth and Dunn Wharf | | by 1893 | after 1893 | warehouses and machine shops | near the foot of Seneca Street | "Ainsworth and Dunn's first 'Fish, Hay and Feed' warehouse"; also H.W. Baker & Co. warehouses, Cha[rle]s Hicks & Co. machine shop. |
| 30 | Arlington Dock/ Arlington Wharf / (possibly distinct) Caine's Wharf (all 1899) | Seen in this 1899 picture. | by 1899 | 1899? 1900? | pier, warehouses, iron works | near University Street | There appears to have been short-lived "Arlington Dock" or "Arlington Wharf" earlier than the others of this name; unlike those others, the photo shows it to have been at 90° to Railroad Avenue. It also included (in photo) a hay and feed warehouse, and Northwestern Iron Works. It is possible that with changes in ownership/names, this could be the same dock as the immediately preceding "first Ainsworth and Dunn Wharf". |
| 31 | Arlington Dock Company (in 1918: Pier 5, N.P. Ry "Waterhouse"; before May 1, 1944: Pier 5 after May 1, 1944: Pier 56) | Pier 56, 2016 more images | 1900 | extant | pier, "primarily a restaurant and small shop venue" | between Seneca and University Streets | Another early Northern Pacific Pier initially used by Arlington Dock Company, this is where the steamship Spokane docked May 23, 1903, bringing President Theodore Roosevelt to Seattle. It soon became the base of operations for the globe-spanning Frank Waterhouse Company, which went bankrupt in 1920, and was later used in the 1930s by Northland Transportation Company for freight and passenger routes, primarily to Southeast Alaska, and by the Shepard Line Intercoastal Service. It was remodeled "based on drawings from 1969" for Trident Imports, and was renovated again in 2000. Ted Griffin's Seattle Marine Aquarium occupied the outer end of the pier from 1962 to 1976. There has been a restaurant as part of the pier at least since 1960. In 1971 it was also home to Seattle Harbor Tours and a restaurant called The Cove. A remark on a photo from MOHAI indicates that the late 1890s Northern Pacific Railroad Pier 2, serving the Alaska Steamship Co., was approximately at this site. |
| 32 | (unidentified pier) | Seen at left in this 1898 picture. | by 1898 | after 1898 | pier | just south of University Street | |
| 33 | Clark and Bartette boathouse | This 1900 picture of a ship at Schwabacher's Wharf presumably shows the Clark and Bartette boathouse at lower right. | 1889-1890 | c. 1901? | boathouse | foot of University Street | |
| 34 | John B. Agen Company, John B. Agen Dock (circa 1905) (from 1909, Milwaukee Pier; also "the old Milwaukee Dock," Milwaukee Road Pier, C.M.& St. P. Ry., Pier 6, C.M.&S.Ry, and in the 1930s McCormick Terminal; in 1912-1913 and before May 1, 1944: Arlington Dock Company, Pier 6 after May 1, 1944: Pier 57) | Pacific Net & Twine Co. at Pier 6 Pier 57, 2013 more images | 1902 | extant | pier, "primarily a restaurant and small shop venue" | foot of University Street | Pier 57 (originally Pier 6) was built in 1902 for the John B. Agen Company and significantly lengthened in 1903. Agen's Alaska Butter and Cream Company used all but the part nearest Railroad Avenue for cold storage, with offices and retail facing the street. Pacific Net & Twine Co. was also an early tenant. In 1909 the pier was bought by the Chicago, Milwaukee & St. Paul Railway Company (the "Milwaukee Road") and Agen moved to a new facility at 1203 Western Avenue. A 1913 listing refers to "Trimble Dock" with 886 feet (270 m) of dock frontage, which might be this, since the land was at one time owned by William Pitt Trimble; they refer separately to the Chesley Dock, so it can't be that. In the 1920s this was the port of call for the Osaka Shoshen Kaisha and the Hamburg America Line. In 1971, the Port of Seattle owned it and operated it as a public fishing pier. The City bought the pier from the Port in 1971 and renovated it, with work completed in 1974. The north side and outboard end of Pier 57 are now part of Waterfront Park, and since June 29, 2012 it has been the site of the Seattle Great Wheel. |
| 35 | Fireboat Wharf | | by 1893 | between 1893 and c. 1936 | small fireboat wharf | "south of the Schwabacher Dock". | One of two downtown fireboat wharves in the 1890s. |
| 36 | Pioneer Boathouse | | by 1907 | after 1913 | boathouse | | Probably the structure at right in this circa 1905 postcard. A 1910 document listing piers in 1907 refers to "Pioneer boathouse (leased of Mr. Trimble)." |
| 37 | Wellington Coal Pier | | probably by 1912 | after c. 1936 | narrow coaling pier | just south of Schwabacher Dock | The 1912 Baist map shows just "coal wharf" here. This may be the "Pier 6 1/2" referred to in the 1918 Port of Seattle map and the 1918 City of Seattle Harbor Department Map of Central Waterfront District, though nothing in either ties it to Wellington or coal. A 1911 Seattle Times article refers to "the [Frank W.] Waterhouse coal bunkers at "Pier 6 1/2" and states that William Pitt Trimble owned the Waterhouse Bunker property. |
| 38 | Schwabacher['s] Wharf (Schwabacher Bros, Schwabacher Dock, Pier 7, Schwabacher Wharf or Dock before May 1, 1944: City Dock Company, Pier 7 after May 1, 1944: Pier 58) | McCormick Steamship Co. at Schwabacher's Wharf, 1935, during seawall construction. | See Schwabacher's Wharf above; this structure predated the Great Seattle Fire | | | | After surviving the Great Seattle Fire of 1889, Schwabacher's Wharf went on to make history in several other ways. On August 31, 1896 the Miike Maru docked there, initiating Seattle's trade relations with Japan. The following year, the ship Portland arrived with the "ton of gold" at the slip between the Schwabacher and the Pike Street Dock, beginning the Klondike Gold Rush and boosting the image of Seattle as the provisioning station and jumping-off point for that gold rush. Some time in the early 20th century Schwabacher's pier was enlarged and significantly rebuilt to conform to Seattle's now-required northeast–southwest alignment for piers, devised in 1897 by City Engineer R.H. Thomson and his assistant George Cotterill; the new pier was a bit south and west of the old one, though overlapping. In the 1920s this was the port of call for the Humboldt Steamship Company; as with Pier 6/57, it was used in the 1930s by the McCormick Steamship Company; and it was used by Alaska Transportation Company from the late 1930s until they went out of business in the late 1940s. After the early 1950s, all that was left was "a small dispatchers office left on the end, and floats for mooring Puget Sound Tug and Barge tugs at the outboard end." |
| 39 | Waterfront Park | Waterfront Park, 2001 more images | 1974 | extant 2022 but closed to the public since August 2020 | city park on planks over water | foot of Union | On the location of the former Pier 58 / Schwabacher's Wharf. Closed to the public because of hazardous conditions 2020; a large portion of it collapsed shortly thereafter. The city is in the process of rebuilding a similar park. |
| 40 | Boston Fish Co. | | by 1893 | after 1893 | storehouse, smoking house, large planked dock. | just south of Pike Street | Boston Fish Co. was west of Railroad Avenue. East of Railroad Avenue, but still on planks over water, were Hunt and T.C. Campbell Packers warehouse and N. Clark & Sons sewer pipe yard. |
| 41 | Pike Street Dock (circa 1908: W. W. Robinson Pike St Wharf; 1912-1915 Dodwell Dock; in 1913: Pier 8 (Ainsworth Dock); in 1918: Pacific Net and Twine; in 1918 and before May 1, 1944: Pier 8; after May 1, 1944: Pier 59) | Pike Street Dock, circa 1905 Pier 59, 2008 more images | 1904 | extant | pier, entrance to Seattle Aquarium | foot of Pike Street / Pike Place Hillclimb | Originally built in 1904 by Ainsworth & Dunn, who were mainly in the fish business and who, with this pier, started the move of the fish business north from its earlier base south of Yesler Way. (The listing of wharves and docks in the 1899 Polk's Directory lists "Ainsworth & Dunn's, foot of Pike", so they may have had some facility on this site as early as 1899.) An early major tenant was Willis Wilbur Robinson, who ran sternwheelers of hay from the Skagit River. A 1910 source, writing about 1907, says Robinson's hay and grain was "mostly government supplies" and that the dock was also used by the U.S. Quartermaster Department. It was also port of call in this era by the Northwestern Steamship Company. Beginning around 1911, signs on the pier show the major tenant as a steamship agent named Dodwell. Beginning in 1916, this was the home of Pacific Net and Twine, later (roughly mid-20th-century) Seattle Marine and Fishing Supply Co. (sited there at least as late as 1971) / Pacific Marine Supply Co. In the 1920s and 1930s the fishing fleet gathered there in the spring before heading north. It is now part of the Seattle Aquarium, including the main entrance and the Omnidome. |
| 42 | City Float | | by 1918 | after 1918 | presumably a floating dock | foot of Pike | |
| 43 | Reliable Oyster & Fish Co. (before May 1, 1944: Salt Dock, Pier 8 1/2, Palace Fish & Oyster Company after May 1, 1944: Pier 60; Arden Salt Dock; in 1971, Main Fish Co.) | Pier 60, 1970 more images | by 1913 | 1975 | pier | foot of Pike | A 1910 list of Seattle piers in 1907 lists "Wright & Smith Machine Shop (leased of San Juan Fish Company)" in this area. That could be the Salt Dock, the Fish Dock, or some (possibly short-lived) pier. The 1899 Polk's Seattle City Directory list of wharves and docks refers to a "Smith's, foot Pike," possibly the same. A 1911 map also attests "San Juan Fish Co." in this area. Circa 1920s, these two piers housed W. R. Grace and Company, Charles Nelson Company, the Matson Navigation Company, and Northwest Fisheries. These two piers were purchased by the Port of Seattle in the mid-1940s, although its use remained the same at that time. This space is now occupied by the Seattle Aquarium |
| 44 | Whiz Fish Products Company (1912: Ocean Fish Co.; 1918: Whiz Fish Co.; before May 1, 1944: Fish Dock, Pier 9 Pier 8-½ after May 1, 1944: Pier 61; in 1971, Fishermen's Cooperative Assn.) | Pier 8-½, later Pier 61, 1935 | by 1918 | 1975 | pier | between Pike & Pine | |
| 45 | Gatzert & McNaught Wharf (in 1889); McNaught's (in 1899) | | (1889 or earlier) | after 1899 | pier/wharf | Between Stewart & Virginia | Pre-fire structure (see above) that apparently survived at least until 1899. |
| 46 | The more southerly of two Virginia Street Piers (Gaffney Dock, in 1913, with Pier 10: Western Alaska S.S. Co. in 1918: Pier 9, Gaffney Dock before May 1, 1944: Newsprint Service Company, Pier 9; after May 1, 1944: Pier 62; in 1971, Puget Sound Freight Lines) | Piers 9 & 10 in 1908 Skybridge, 1908, piers at right Pier 9 in 1935 Piers 62 & 63, 2009 more images | 1901 | extant, though with no pier shed | pier | foot of Pine Street | The Pier 9/62 shed was built about a year after the pier itself. Piers 62 and 63 adjoin directly to one another. Historically, they were used mainly to store newsprint shipped in from Canada. In its early years, the Gaffney Dock served Alaska Commercial Company steamships and the Holden or Virginia Street Dock was home to Northwest Fisheries salmon cannery. These docks were significantly reconfigured several times. From 1991 to 2005, the bare planks of the pier were the site of the "Summer Nights at the Pier" concerts, but Pier 62 became too deteriorated for mass gatherings. The piers have generally remained open for more passive uses. The city plans to rehabilitate them as waterfront open space, capable of holding events again. There was at one time a skybridge to these docks across Railroad Avenue from Virginia Street, but the docks are a bit south of Virginia. There appears to be some confusion on historical numbering of piers in this area. Daryl C. McClary, in listing the 1944 name changes, refers to the two Virginia Street Piers before the renaming as Piers 9 & 10, respectively, and gives no pre-1944 numbers to the Fish and Salt Docks. The 1918 Port of Seattle map makes no mention of the Salt Dock, refers to the Fish Dock as "Pier 9, Whiz Fish Co." and groups, apparently at the location of the Virginia Street Piers, "W.F. Jahn Co, [Pier] 11A, Pier 10, Virginia St. Wharf," with the next pier north being "U.S.Q.M. Wharf, Pier 11B". |
| 47 | The more northerly of two Virginia Street Piers (early on, Holden Dock, Virginia Street Dock, Virginia Dock; in 1913, with Pier 10: Western Alaska S.S. Co. in 1918: Pier 10, Virginia St. Dock before May 1, 1944: Newsprint Service Company, Pier 10; after May 1, 1944: Pier 63; in 1971, Puget Sound Freight Lines) | Piers 9 & 10 in 1908 Skybridge, 1908, piers at right Pier 9 in 1935 Piers 62 & 63, 2009 more images | 1906 | extant, though with no pier shed | pier | just north of Pine Street | |
| 48 | Pier D | | by 1904 | after 1908, by 1920s | warehouse, steamship dock | foot of Lenora Street | These two docks built and owned by the Pacific Coast Company appear to have adjoined. Parallel to shore, rather than finger piers. As of 1904-1905 this held one of the United Warehouse Company warehouses (others were inland) and Oriental Dock was port of call for the American Hawaiian Steamship Company. A 1910 report specifically refers to the port with the United Warehouse Company warehouses as "Pier 11". The 1912 Baist map shows a single wharf parallel to the shore here, labeled as Pier 11, and naming both Pacific Coast Company and United Warehouse Company. "Seattle One of the World's Great Ports" (Railway & Marine News volume 11, number 12, August 1, 1913), refers to a "Bratnober Dock" in this area with 621 feet (189 m) of dock frontage. That might or might not be the same structure as Pier D. The Bratnober family were primarily in the lumber business. |
| 49 | Oriental Dock (in 1913: Pier 11, Oriental Dock; in 1918: Oriental Dock, Pier 11, W.F. Jahn Co.) | | by 1904 | after 1918, by 1920s | warehouse, steamship dock | foot of Lenora Street | |
| 50 | Lenora Street Dock (Canadian Pacific RR) (after May 1, 1944: Pier 64) | Pier 64 circa 1980. | by early 1920s | after 1974 1990s? | pier | foot of Lenora Street | This directly adjoined Pier 65. The pier was owned by the Port of Seattle and was used by Canadian Pacific Railway steamers from the early 1920s until they ceased operation c. 1974. |
| 51 | Lenora Street Dock (Leslie Salt Company) before May 1, 1944: Pier 11-B; after May 1, 1944: Pier 65) | Pier 11-B at right, 1925 | by 1925 | after 1971 1990s? | fish dock | foot of Lenora Street | As early as 1918, the Port of Seattle map shows a "U.S.Q.M. Wharf, Pier 11B" (that is, "United States Quartermaster Wharf...") at roughly this location, possibly the same structure; similarly, the 1918 City of Seattle Harbor Department Map of Central Waterfront District refers to "U.S. Government Pier 11B". This directly adjoined Pier 64. In the 1930s it became a major center for auto freight. The 1971 harbor map lists it as New England Fish Co. |
| 52 | Bell Street Terminal (Port of Seattle) (Bell Street Wharf, Bell Street Pier, Port of Seattle Bell St. Pier; after May 1, 1944: Pier 66) | Bell Street Terminal, 1915 more images | 1914 | after 1971 1990s? | shipping terminal, with park, solarium, and pool on roof | | Park, solarium, and pool were added 1915, "but by the 1920s, the park had developed an unsavory reputation and was closed." The 1971 harbor map shows it as still Bell Street Terminal, and lists the Port of Seattle general offices and the Pioneer Alaska Line. |
| 53 | Bell Street Pier / Pier 66 | Pier 66, 2016 Cruise ship at Bell Street Pier, 2018 | mid-1990s | extant | pier, marina, cruise ship dock, restaurants, conference center | foot of Bell Street | Extends on shore from Blanchard Street northwest past Bell almost to Battery; outer pier around the Bell Harbor Marina extends southeast another block to Lenora |
| 54 | Brighton's Boathouse | | 1894 | ? | boathouse | foot of Battery Street | |
| 55 | Wall Street Pier (in 1913: Galbraith, Bacon & Co. Wall Street Dock in 1918: Pier 12, Galbraith Bacon Co. Galbraith Bacon Dock; before May 1, 1944: Galbraith and Company, Pier 12 after May 1, 1944: Pier 67) | Wall Street Dock, 1906 | shortly after 1900 | 1962 or very shortly before | storage facility for building materials | | Torn down to build the hotel now known as The Edgewater. |
| 56 | The Edgewater (Camelot; Edgewater Inn) | The Edgewater, 2008 more images | 1962 | extant | hotel | foot of Wall Street | The hotel sits on a pier on the site of Pier 67 and part of Pier 68, both of which were demolished to build the hotel. |
| 57 | in 1913: Richmond Beach Sand & Gravel Co. (in 1918: Central Sand & Gravel Co.; in 1918: Booth Fisheries Co., Richmond Beach Sand & Gravel) | | between 1907 and 1912 | after 1912 | sand and gravel wharf | exactly at the foot of Wall Street | The 1912 Baist map shows a small unnamed sand and gravel wharf exactly at the foot of Wall Street, immediately south of the Chlopeck Fish Company. "Seattle One of the World's Great Ports" (Railway & Marine News volume 11, number 12, August 1, 1913) refers to "Richmond Beach Sand & Gravel Co.". The 1918 Port of Seattle map gives the name Central Sand & Gravel Co. and shows it nestled tightly between Booth Fisheries and the Galbraith-Bacon Dock |
| 58 | Squire's Wharf | | c.1888 | after 1899 | pier/wharf | Between Stewart & Virginia | Pre-fire structure (see above) that apparently survived at least until 1899. |
| 59 | Hall's Wharf; (possibly distinct) Mannings Wharf) | | (1888 or earlier) | after 1899 | pier/wharf | Between Wall & Vine | Pre-fire structures (see above) that apparently survived at least until 1899. |
| 60 | Chlopeck Fish Company (by 1918, and remaining May 1, 1944: Booth Fisheries Company; after May 1, 1944: Pier 68) | Chlopeck Fish Co, 1907 | by 1905 | 1962 or very shortly before | fish warehouse | just north of the foot of Wall Street | There were related warehouses and fish processing facilities on the other side of Railroad Avenue, at least one of which survives as Vine Street Storage at 2501 Elliott Avenue; two cottages built for workers here also survive. The pier was torn down to build the hotel now known as The Edgewater. |
| 61 | Pioneer Sand & Gravel Co. (in 1918: Pacific Coast Co., Pioneer Sand & Gravel Co.) | | after 1907, by 1918 | after 1918 | sand and gravel wharf | Between Chlopeck/Booth Fish and Seattle/Superior Fish | This presumably short-lived pier shows up on the 1918 Port of Seattle map in what appears to be part of the area into which American Can Company eventually expanded. |
| 62 | in 1912: Seattle Fish & Storage Co. (in 1913: Pacific Coast Co.; in 1918: Superior Fish Co.) | | by 1912 | after 1918 | very shallow pier with buildings | from foot of Vine Street just past Cedar | The 1912 Baist map shows a small pier with several structures including the Seattle Fish & Storage Co., extending only a little past Railroad Avenue, in part of the space that would later be occupied by the expanded American Can Company pier. |
| 63 | Pier 13 (in 1913: Roslyn Coal Co.; in 1918: American Can Co.; before May 1, 1944: American Can Company Dock; after May 1, 1944: Pier 69) | American Can Company including pier at left, c. 1920. more images | 1900 | extant | successively a coal pier, fish processing facility, and a ferry terminal | between Vine and Clay Streets | Originally built for the Roslyn Coal and Coke Company, it was completely remodeled and expanded by the American Can Company, who connected it by a skybridge to a building on the other side of Railroad Avenue. The 1912 Baist map still has this as Roslyn; but the 1918 Port of Seattle map has it as American Can Company, but not yet expanded to the south at the expense of the wharves to its south. The American Can Company (still there in 1971) sold the pier and a large onshore building to "a Canadian interest"; the Princess Marguerite used the pier for some time beginning around 1979. Since another complete remodel ending in 1993, it has housed the Port of Seattle headquarters, and is also the Seattle dock for Clipper Navigation's Victoria Clipper hydrofoil service. |
| 64 | Ainsworth and Dunn Wharf, Pier 14 (in 1918: Pier 14, Dodwell Wharf; in 1918: Pier 14, Ainsworth & Dunn before May 1, 1944: Washington State Liquor Warehouse, Pier 14 after May 1, 1944: Pier 70) | As Puget Sound Wharf and Warehouse Company, at right, 1903 Pier 14, c. 1935 Pier 70, 2015 more images | 1902 | extant | various uses, see notes | foot of Broad Street | Built in 1902 as Pier 14 by fish company Ainsworth and Dunn (their name was still associated with the pier as late as 1971), whose warehouse was across Railroad Avenue and who had several prior Central Waterfront locations. Not long after, they moved their operations to Blaine, Washington, and the pier had a long series of major tenants including the Puget Sound Wharf and Warehouse Company, the American-Hawaiian Steamship Company, and the Dodwell Dock and Warehouse Company. Dodwell used the pier as a terminal for the Northland Steamship Company and the Blue Funnel Line. The Washington State Liquor Control Board used the pier as a warehouse during World War II, and the U.S. Coast Guard used the pier as its Seattle base from 1946 to 1955. Its historic uses were superseded by containerization, and it was remodeled to house shops and restaurants. Triad Development bought the pier in 1995, remodeled it in the late 1990s as a headquarters for the ill-fated Go2Net. Immediately before that remodel, in 1998 The Real World: Seattle was filmed there. Although the pier shed retains its historic shape, it was remodeled after a fire in 1915, remodeled again in the 1970s, and so heavily altered in the late 1990s that it retains only traces of its historic character. |

=== Broad Street to Magnolia ===
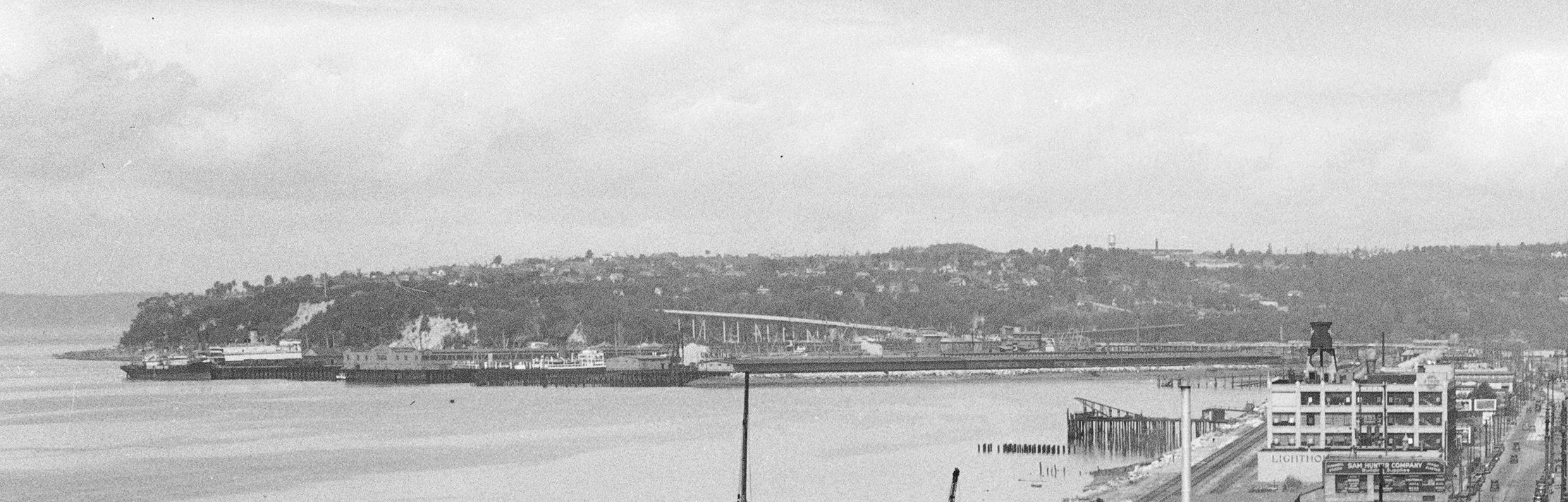
Piers near Smith Cove, 1934, with Magnolia behind them. From left to right, the piers that would later be numbered 91, 90, 89, and 88. The white building just below the high end of the Garfield Bridge (now Magnolia Bridge) is the grain elevator on Pier 89; much of the length of Pier 88 is visible.

| | Name (Alternative names in parentheses) | Image | Year completed | Year destroyed | Type | Location | Notes |
|---|---|---|---|---|---|---|---|
| 1 | Union Oil Co. Wharf (before May 1, 1944: Union Oil Dock, Pier 18 after May 1, 1944: Pier 71) | Union Oil facility including dock at left, 1934 Pacific Mildcure Company at left, circa 1917-1920; Union Oil takes up most of the photo. | 1910 | between 1971 and 1989, | oil dock | site of present-day Olympic Sculpture Park | There was quite a large dock here as of 1913: 1,097 feet (334 m) of fock frontage. |
| 2 | in 1912: Occidental Fish Co. (in 1918: Pier 18, Pacific Mildcure Co.) | Union Oil facility including dock at left, 1934 Pacific Mildcure Company at left, circa 1917-1920; Union Oil takes up most of the photo. | between 1907 and 1912 | after 1918 | pier with shed | just north of Union Oil Co. Wharf | |
| 3 | "Bell's" and "Whitford's" docks/wharves | | by 1899 | after 1899 | docks/wharves | foot of Bay (2 blocks north of Broad Street) | The 1899 Polk's Directory indicates these two docks/wharves at the foot of Bay Street. |
| 4 | Martin Gravel Co. | | by 1907 | after 1913 | gravel pier | | |
| 5 | A.S. Kary | | by 1907 | by 1910 | lumber dock | | |
| 6 | Colman Creosoting Works | | by 1907 | between 1911 and 1918 | wood treatment plant, roughly L-shaped pier | foot of W. Thomas Street, corner of Third Ave West. | The 1918 Port map shows this as filled land. As of 2019, this is roughly where a pedestrian bridge crosses Elliott Ave. W. |
| 7 | Gridiron | | by 1918 | after 1918 | "gridiron" | very slightly southeast of Harrison St. Wharf | |
| 8 | City of Seattle, Harrison St. Wharf (City Dock, Harrison Street Pier) | | between 1912 and 1918 | | wharf | foot of W. Harrison Street | No indication of this on the 1912 Baist map, but it is on the 1918 Port map. |
| 9 | Seattle Lumber Co. | | by 1907 | between 1911 and 1918 | sawmills and wharf | roughly from W. Harrison to W. Mercer Streets | The 1912 Baist map shows an extensive lumber yard on planks over water on the onshore side of the rail trestle, with a roughly L-shaped pier on the offshore side. The lumber company remained there after the land was filled, becoming Blackstock Lumber from the 1930s to the 1980s, and the small part of the property north of Mercer being the site of Seattle's Humane Society from the 1930s to the 1970s. |
| 10 | Terminal 86 Grain Facility (Pier 86 Grain Terminal | Pier 86 grain terminal, 2006 more images | 1970 | extant | grain terminal | Elliott Bay Park, roughly on a line with W. Roy Street | "Total grain storage capacity is almost 4 million bushels (over 101,000 metric tons) and is divided into 8 shipping bins, 60 large tanks, 39 interstices, and 13 house bins. The dock is 600 feet long and can accommodate a 1,400 foot vessel." All of the incoming grain arrives by rail. |
| 11 | The N & S Electric | Citizens Light and Power Company gas plant in middle ground at right, 1902 | by 1902? by 1912 | after 1912 | gas plant | foot of W. Highland Drive | The 1912 Baist map shows this between the rail trestle and Elliott Ave W. It is not clear whether this was on planks or fill. By 1918, this was certainly filled land. Quite likely the same thing as the Citizens Light and Power Company gas plant at or near this site, which existed by 1902. |
| 12 | Commercial Hotel | | by 1912 | after 1912 | hotel, on planking | foot of W. Galer Street, just outside the Great Northern facilities | The 1912 Baist map shows a triangular hotel on planking on the onshore side of the rail trestle. By 1918, this land appears to be filled. |
| 13 | Great Northern Hotel | Hotel at right in this 1909 picture | by 1909 | after 1909 | hotel, on planking | near foot of W. Galer Street | |
| 14 | Great Northern Dock (G. N. Ry. Dock, Great Northern Railroad Dock, G.N. Ry Asiatic Freight Warehouse & G.N. Ry Warehouse; after May 1, 1944: Pier 88) | See photo above, "Piers near Smith Cove..." | after 1944 | extant | steamship pier | Smith Cove | This area is now part of the filled land east of the Elliott Bay Trail. |
| 15 | Great Northern Grain Elevator Dock (G. N. Ry. Elevator & Dock, Balfour Gutherie Grain Elevator; after May 1, 1944: Pier 89) | See photo above, "Piers near Smith Cove..." | 1890s | burned November 6, 1925 | grain terminal | Smith Cove | Damaged, but not destroyed, by fire October 15, 1918; destroyed by fire November 6, 1925. At the time this burned, it was leased by the Centennial Mill Company and Northwest Magnesite Company. Centennial Mill Company relocated to Tacoma after the fire. |
| 16 | Great Northern Grain Elevator Dock (after May 1, 1944: Pier 89) | See photo above, "Piers near Smith Cove..." | 1926 | after 1944 | grain terminal | Smith Cove | Replaced the similarly located earlier structure that burned in 1925. Initial major tenants were the Northwest Magnesite Company and the Pacific Grain Products Company of Spokane. This area is now part of the filled land east of the Elliott Bay Trail. |
| 17 | Port Commission Smith Cove Terminal (Port of Seattle Smith's Cove Pier; before May 1, 1944: U.S. Navy, Pier 40; after May 1, 1944: Pier 90; 1971: U.S. Naval Supply Center) | See photo above, "Piers near Smith Cove..." | between c. 1912 and 1918 | extant | now part of the T91 cruise ship terminal | Smith Cove | According to Daryl C. McClary, the Port of Seattle purchased this property in Smith Cove from the Great Northern Railway and built Piers 40 and 41 (now Piers 90 and 91). The piers have been differently configured at different times. A 1947 or 1948 photograph shows them as part of a de facto Navy base (the 13th Naval District Operating Annex, or NOA), with a series of sheds occupying both sides and the south end of Pier 90, as well as the north half of Pier 91. Since 2009, Pier 91 has been the site of the Smith Cove Cruise Terminal. |
| 18 | Port Commission Smith Cove Terminal (Port of Seattle Smith's Cove Pier; before May 1, 1944: U.S. Navy, Pier 41; after May 1, 1944: Pier 91; 1971: U.S. Naval Supply Center, Captain of the Port, Seattle) | See photo above, "Piers near Smith Cove..." | between 1912 and by 1918 | extant | now part of the T91 cruise ship terminal | Smith Cove | |
| 19 | Pioneer Glass Works | | by 1912 | after 1912 | glass works | north entrance to Smith Cove, in Magnolia | The 1912 Baist map shows a rail spur along the north side of Smith Cove, leading to this glass works at the tip. |
| 20 | Elliott Bay Marina | Elliott Bay Marina, 2012 more images | 1991 | extant | pleasure-boat marina | south side of Magnolia | |

== See also ==
- List of bridges in Seattle
