= Pier 1, Seattle =

Former shipping terminal in Washington State, US

Coordinates: 47°36′03″N 122°20′11″W

Pier 1, Seattle, Washington
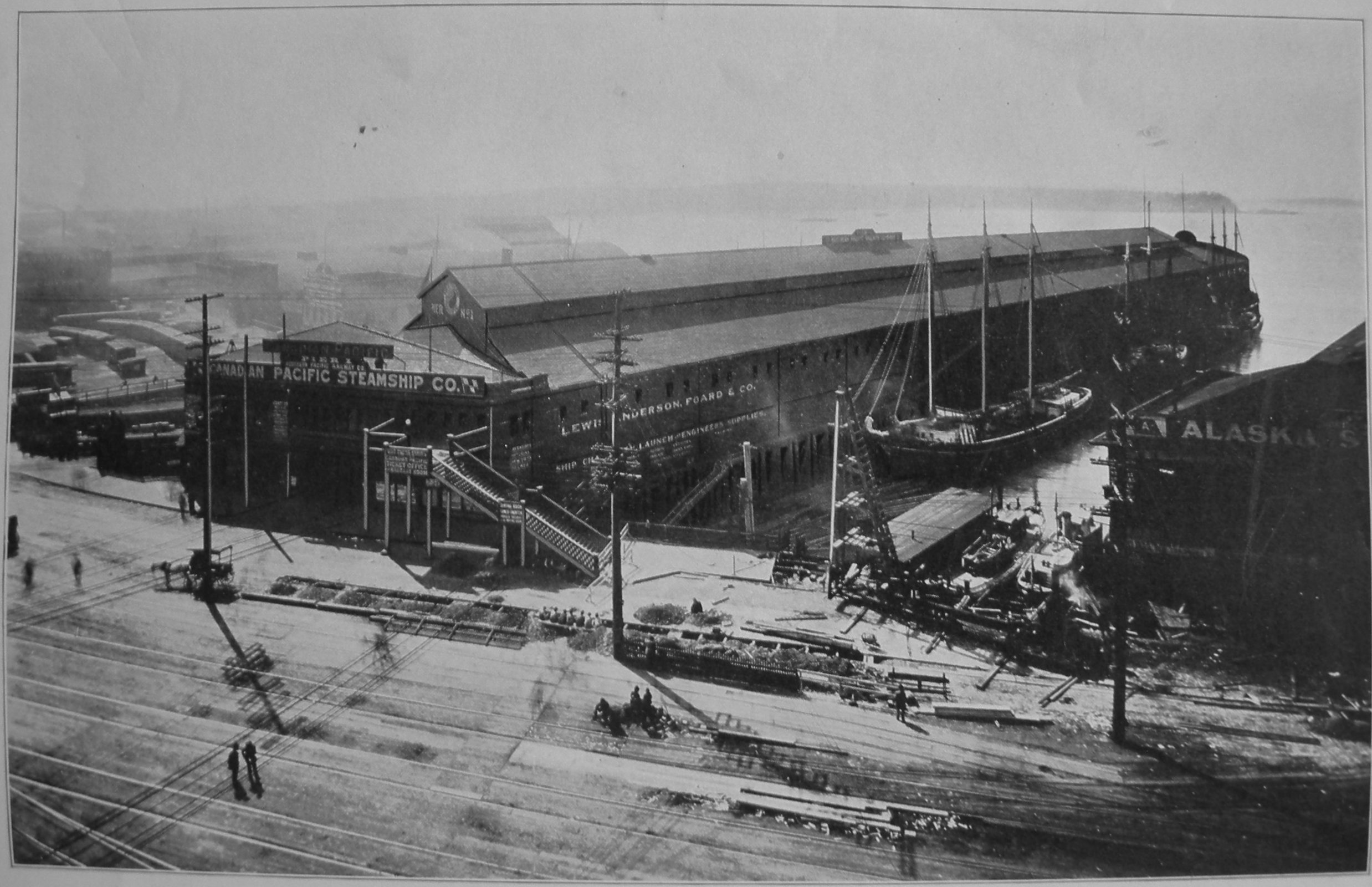
- Pier 1 circa 1915
- Type: Shipping pier and warehouse
- Location: Seattle, Washington
- Owner: Northern Pacific Railway

Characteristics
- Total length: 840 ft (256.0 m)
- Width: 100 ft (30.5 m)

Pier 1 in Seattle, Washington (after May 1, 1944, Pier 50) was an important shipping terminal.

== Location ==
Pier 1 was located at the foot of Washington Street. Pier 1 was immediately to the north of Pier A and immediately to the south of Pier 2.

== History ==
Pier 1 and Pier 2 to its north were built between 1901 and 1904, replacing Yesler's Wharf. According to Paul Dorpat, the first tenant of Pier 1 was the Luckenback/Luckenbach Steamship Co. (he gives both spellings) for their intercoastal service. Alaska Steam Ship Company was there as early as the first decade of the 20th century, when they shared the pier with the Port Angeles-Victoria Line and the Vancouver Line.

In 1917, Pier 1 was owned by the Northern Pacific Railway, and operated bv the Canadian Pacific Steamship Company, the Pacific-Alaska Navigation Co., and the Port Angeles Transportation Co, and was also the headquarters of the port warden. Pier 1 measured 840 by 120 feet (256 by 37 m), and had a warehouse measuring 840 by 100 feet (256 by 30 m), with a cargo capacity of 20,000 tons. Twenty (20) railway cars could be loaded on the racks that were on the pier, which was equipped with adjustable slips. In 1917, Pier 1 was equipped with then-modern waiting rooms and offices. The pier was also the headquarters of the port warden. The depth of water at Pier 1 was 40 feet (12 m) at low tide.

In the late 1940s, Alaska Steamship Co. moved to Pier 42 and Nippon Yusen Kaisha used this pier until September 17, 1960 as port of call for the Hikawa Maru, the only Japanese passenger ship to survive the WWII. In 1971, the pier was owned and/or operated by Seattle Piers, Inc. and, along with Pier 51, was the proposed site for a World Trade Center, which was ultimately built elsewhere. The pier was torn down early 1980s to expand the Washington State Ferries terminal at Pier 52 (Colman Dock).
